= Herne Bay Museum and Gallery =

Local history museum in Herne Bay, Kent, England

Coordinates: 51°22′09″N 1°07′40″E

The Seaside Museum
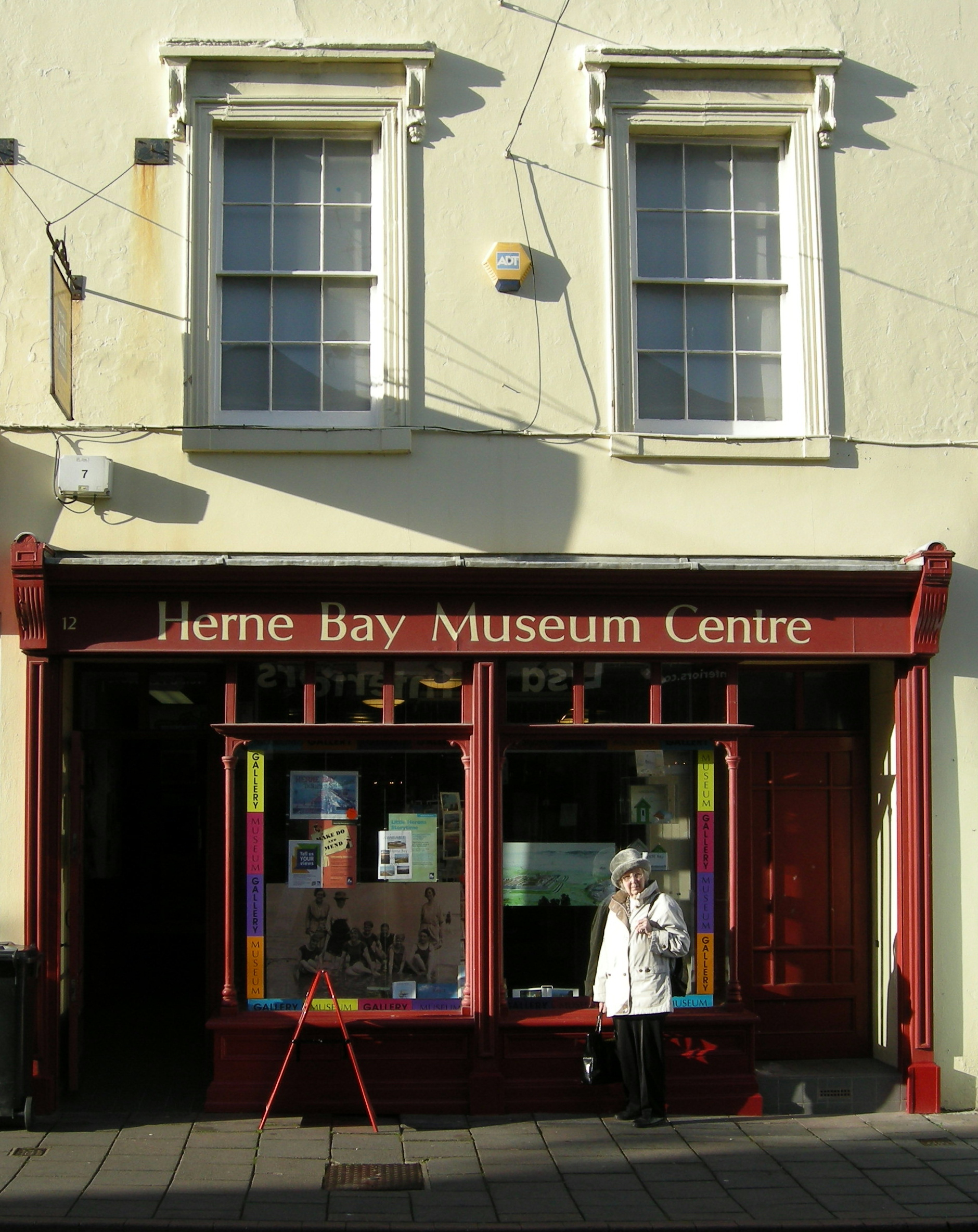
- Georgian
- Established: 1932 as Herne Bay Records Society; 1936: 53 Mortimer St, Herne Bay; 1939: Library, Herne Bay High St; 1996: 12 William St, Herne Bay
- Location: 12 William Street, Herne Bay, Kent CT6 6BS
- Type: Local history museum, history of the seaside, art gallery, heritage centre
- Public transit access: Herne Bay railway station; Stagecoach for buses
- Website: www.theseasidemuseumhernebay.org

The Seaside Museum Herne Bay is a local museum in Herne Bay, Kent, England. It was established in 1932, (as the Herne Bay Museum) and is notable for being a seaside tourist attraction featuring local archaeological and social history, for featuring the history of the town as a tourist resort, for its local art exhibitions and for its World War II bouncing bomb. The management of the Museum was awarded by Canterbury City Council to the Herne Bay Museum Trust, who reopened it in July 2015, as The Seaside Museum Herne Bay.

== History ==
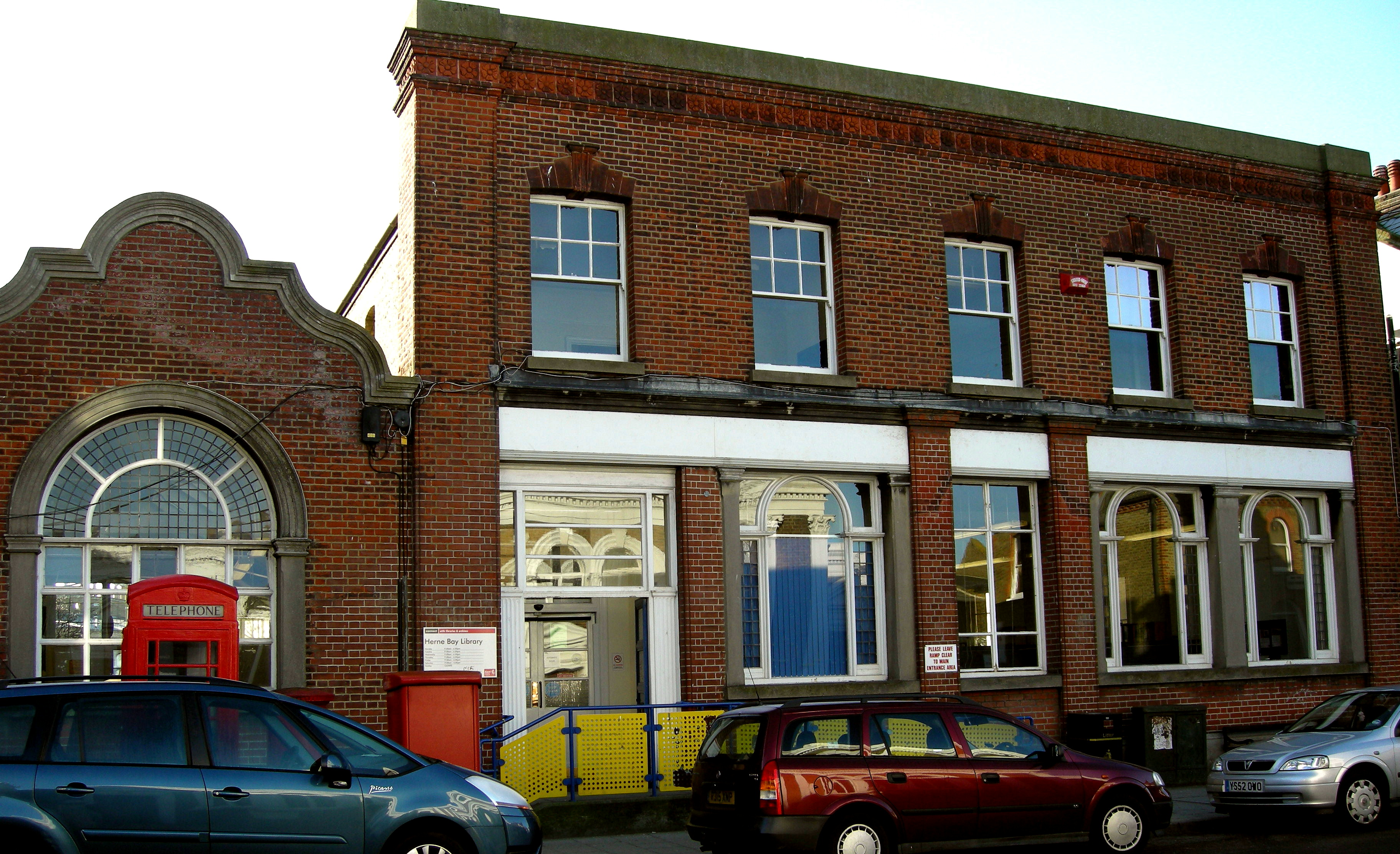
Herne Bay Library

The museum was originally established in 1932 as Herne Bay Records Society (known as Herne Bay Historical Records Society from 1988). From 1936 to 1939 the exhibits were in the hall at 53 Mortimer Street, Herne Bay, and from 1939 the museum was sited in the High Street above the Public Library. It moved to its present no. 12 William Street site in 1996. The William Street premises is a Georgian building now in a Conservation Area, and William Street was the main shopping street until at least 1883. It was run for years by local historian, Harold Gough, and is funded and administered by Canterbury City Council. The exhibits are owned by Herne Bay Historical Records Society, and loaned to Canterbury City Council museums service. The museum was a Canterbury City Council Mystery Shopper Awards 2009 silver award winner. The gallery hosts local art exhibitions, and there is a free events programme.

=== Dr Tom Bowes ===
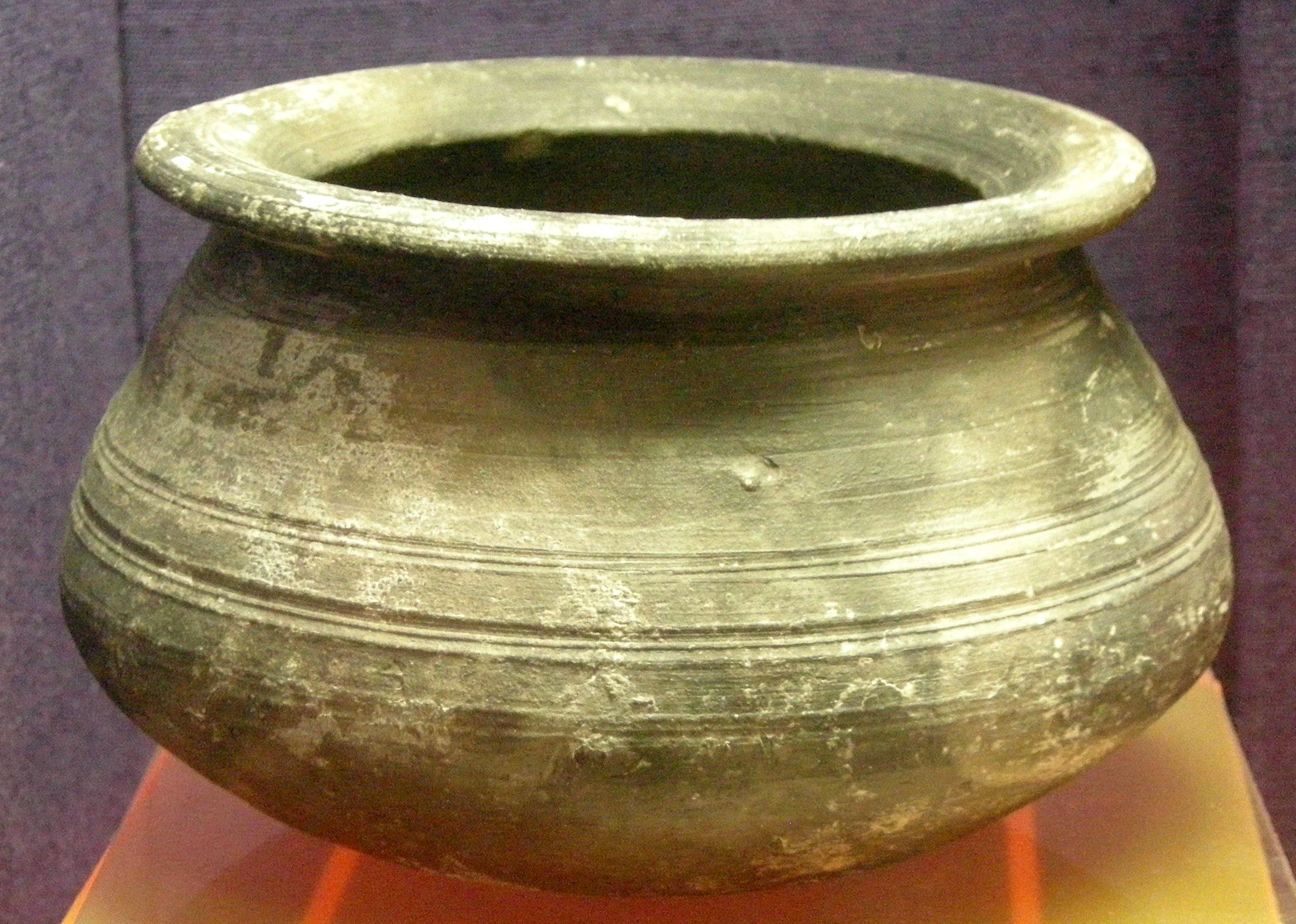
Marshside Bowl: 5th–6th century Saxon bowl found at Marshside

Dr Tom Armstrong Bowes MA MD FSA (1869–1954) was a local medical doctor, local historian, antiquarian and collector. He rescued stone tools, pottery and artefacts turned up by workmen and builders in the area, benefiting greatly from the constant excavations of F.W.J. Palmer who was Surveyor to the Council between 1891 and 1915. He photographed local historical artefacts to make lantern slides for his lectures. He retired in 1930 and founded the Herne Bay Records Society and Museum in 1932, and donated much of his collection in 1936 to the museum, where it was housed in the hall at 53 Mortimer Street. He was president of the HBRS from 1949 to 1951.

=== Harold Eric Gough ===
Harold Eric Gough was a successor to Dr Tom Bowes in that he was a local writer, historian and honorary curator of the Herne Bay Records Society who helped to run the museum for many years. He was responsible, for example, for the museum's exhibits on Herne Bay clock tower, the first of its kind, and for researching the clock tower and other local landmarks, such as Herne Bay Pier. He was president of the Herne Bay Historical Records Society from 1992 to 2008.

=== Ken Reedie ===
Ken Reedie was curator of the Canterbury museums from the early 1970s until 2011.

== Exhibits ==
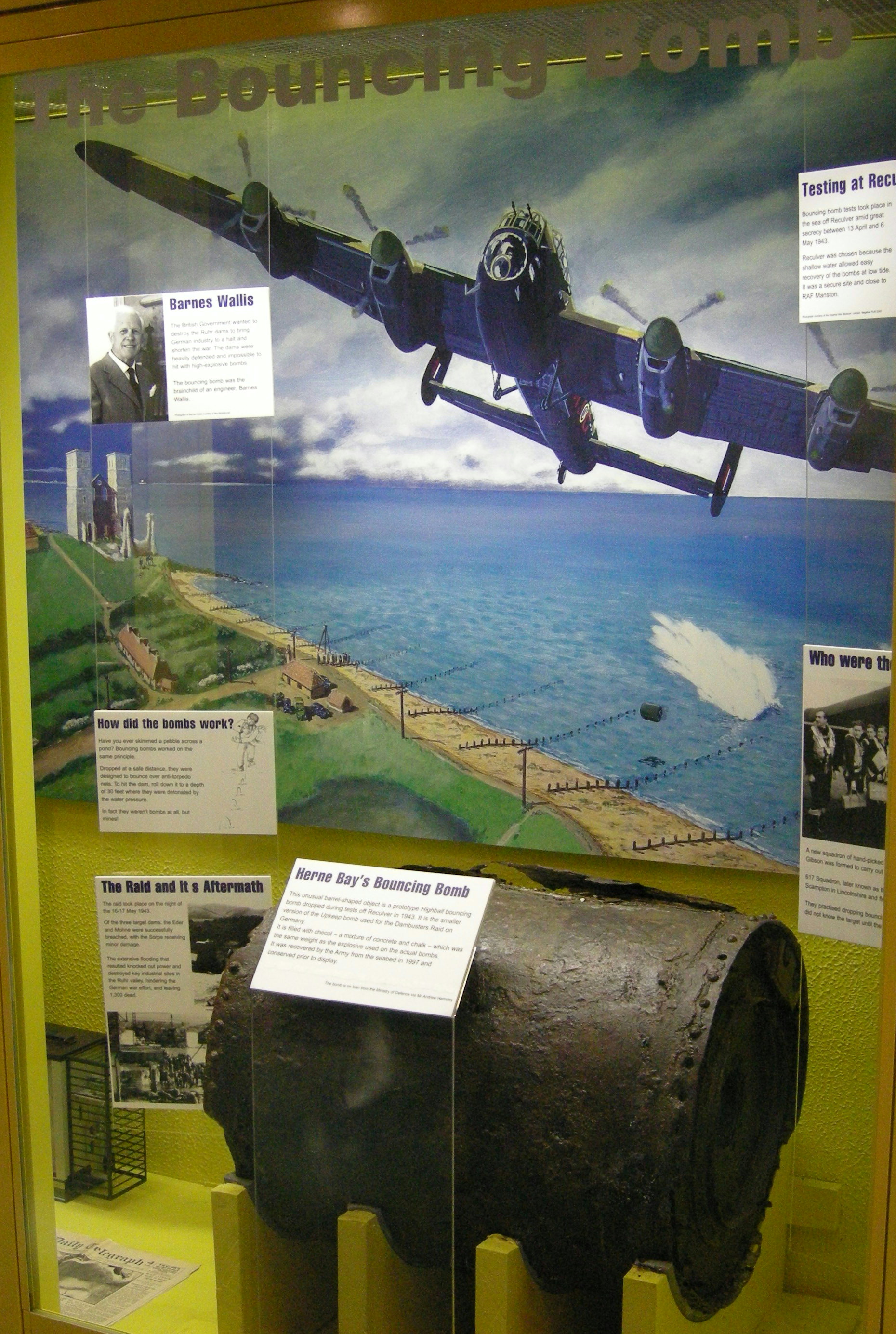
Bouncing bomb exhibit

The collections illustrate 60 million years of living history in the area, from fossils through Stone Age artefacts, the Roman fort and Anglo-Saxon church at Reculver, smuggling at Herne, the town's development as a Victorian seaside resort, the two world wars and social history. Themes include the surrounding area, holidays, piers, the clock tower, archaeology, palaeontology and local history. Thus the museum provides material for education about evolution as well as preserving a sense of local identity, as oral history would have done in previous cultures. Most of the museum's collections are owned by the Herne Bay Historical Trust, which inherited them from Dr Tom Bowes.

=== Bouncing bomb ===
The main attraction for tourists is a prototype of the World War II Barnes Wallis Highball bouncing bomb that was tested in the sea off Reculver between 6 April and 13 May 1943. The location was chosen because the shallow water allowed easy recovery at low tide, and it was secure and close to RAF Manston. To imitate the weight of explosive, the designers filled the Highball with checol: concrete and chalk. The Army found this exhibit on the seabed in 1997, and it has been conserved for display. The Upkeep bouncing bomb, a later development of this prototype, was used in the 1943 Dambuster raids.

Really a mine and not a bomb, it worked by skimming like a pebble over water to jump over torpedo nets. It was then designed to hit the dam and roll down to 30 feet where the water pressure caused detonation.

=== Archaeology and palaeontology ===
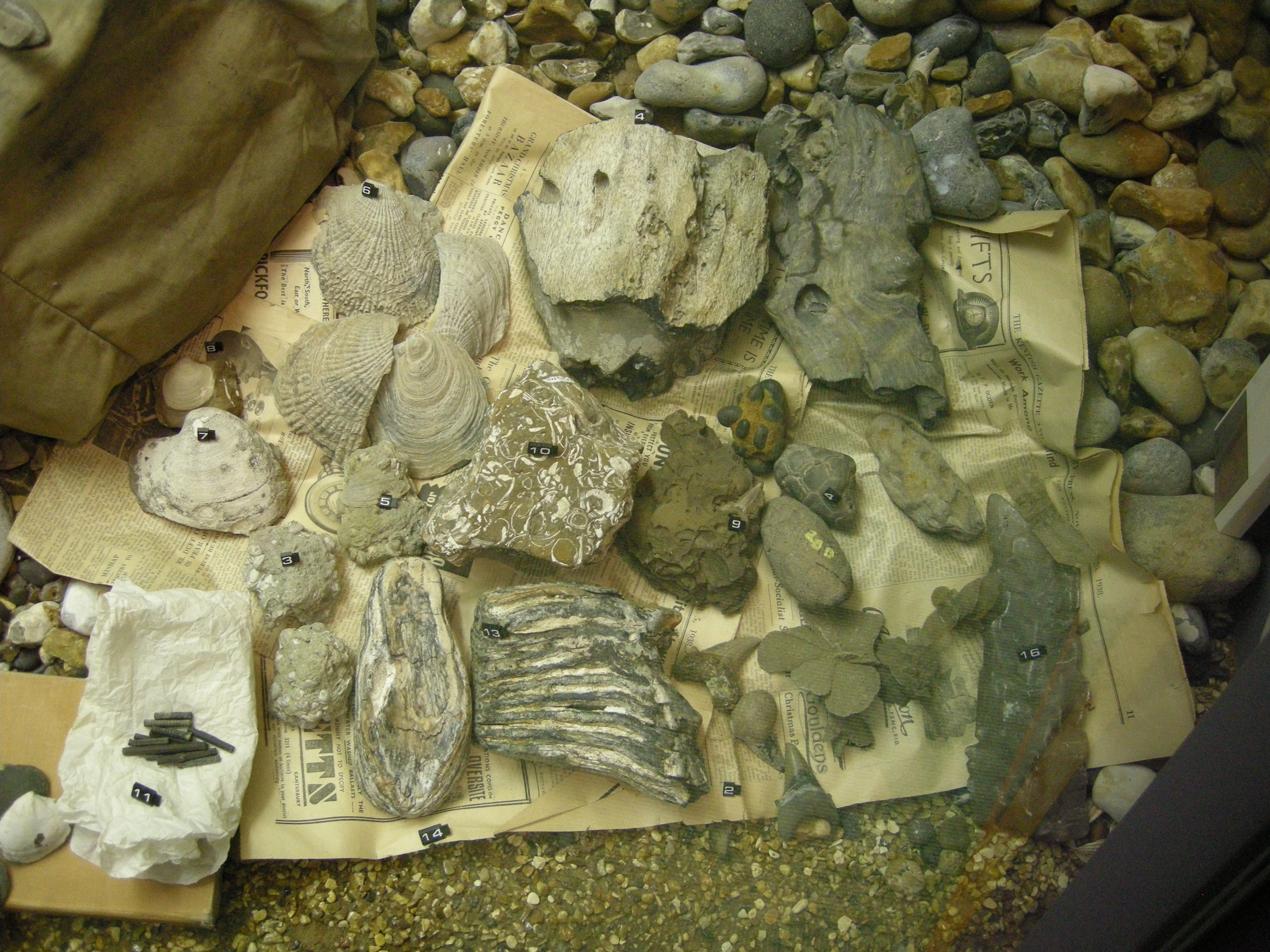
Fossils found at Bishopstone, Kent

Archaeological exhibits include Anglo-Saxon finds from the Saxon church at Reculver and Roman archaeology from the Roman fort of Regulbium nearby. Palaeontological exhibits include mammoth tusks and an educational search exercise for children to find sharks' teeth: first in trays at the museum, where there are five Stratolamia macrota, and then in the sand and small stones at low tide.

There is an exhibit of numbered and named fossils found in 1939 at Bishopstone by beachcomber J. E. Cooper. It consists of the following 50–60 million-years-old items: sharks' teeth Stratolamia striata and Odotus obliquus; green sandstone from the Thanet Sands layer containing the tiny bivalve shell fossils Corbula regulbiensis; fossil wood and pine cones; Thanet Sand containing the bivalve shell Cucullaea decusata; fossil oyster shells Ostrea bellovacina; the large bivalve Arctica scutellaria; Arctica morrisi bivalve casts, one with shell; brown sandstone from the Oldhaven Beds layer with shark's tooth; Arctica morrisi and other bivalves in Oldhaven Beds sandstone; stems of the sea lily, which is related to the sea urchin; fossil fish backbones; Ice age mammoth tooth; sea-worn mammoth tooth; selenite sand roses (not fossils); selenite crystals from London Clay layer. These were gathered in a single day and had been washed out of the cliffs by the sea.

==== Roman fort at Reculver ====
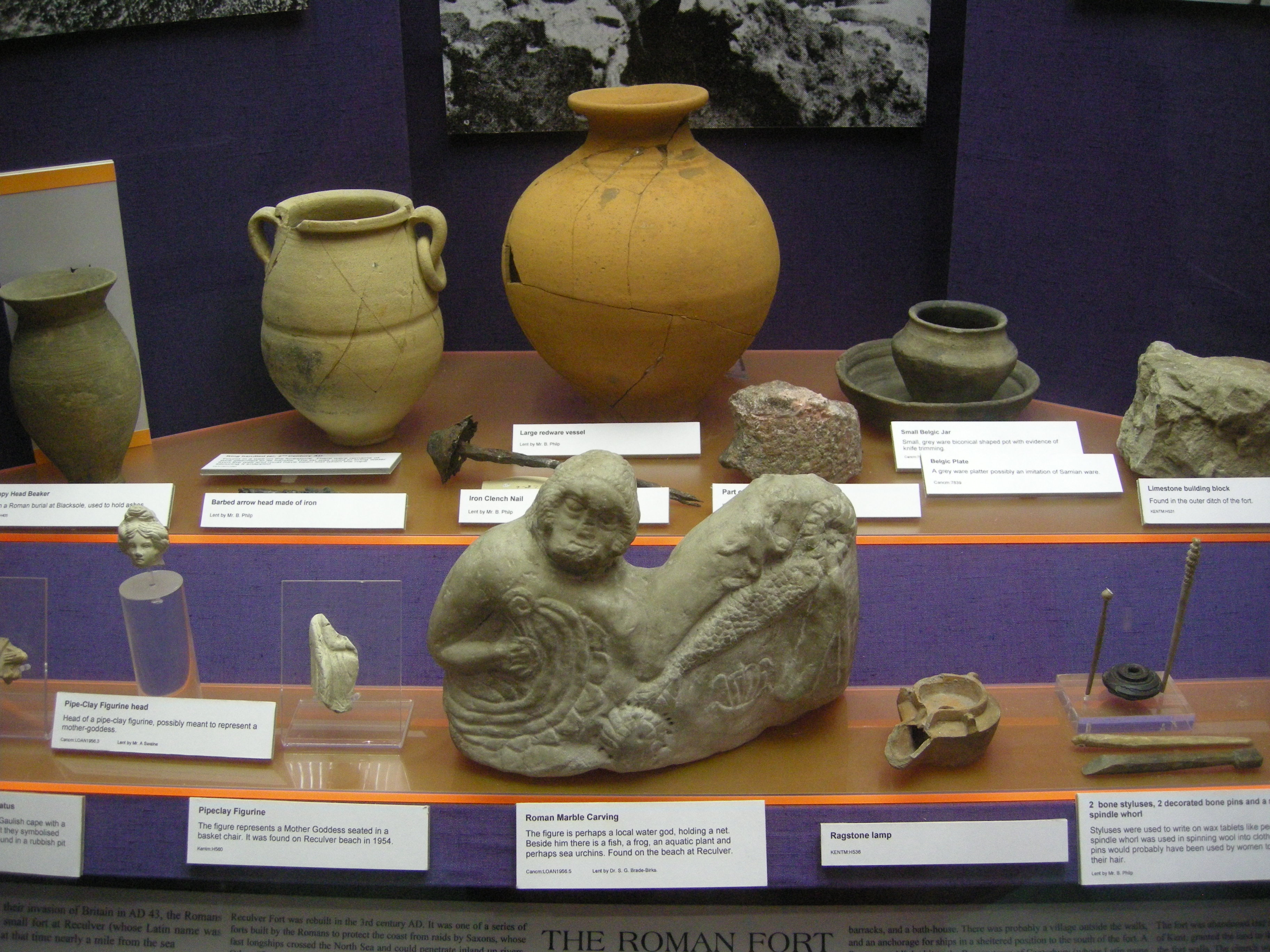
Roman artefacts from the fort at Reculver

This was established soon after 43 CE, on land which was at that time a mile from the sea, at the north end of the Wantsum channel. The Wantsum once separated Thanet from mainland Kent, and the fort was probably there to defend the Roman fleet anchored in the channel. It was rebuilt in the third century CE to protect the coast from Saxon longship raids. It was 170 by 180 metres, with three-metre-thick walls with gates, surrounded partly by an earth rampart, and partly by two ditches. The fort contained roads, a headquarters building, stores, barracks and a bath-house. It was associated with its own service village and a road to Canterbury.

Roman exhibits found at the fort or in the sea nearby include a limestone building block, Belgic ware, redware, an iron clench pin, a barbed arrowhead, a funerary urn or poppy beaker, pipe clay figurines, a marble carving, a ragstone lamp, styluses, bone pins, a shale spindle whorl and wall plaster.

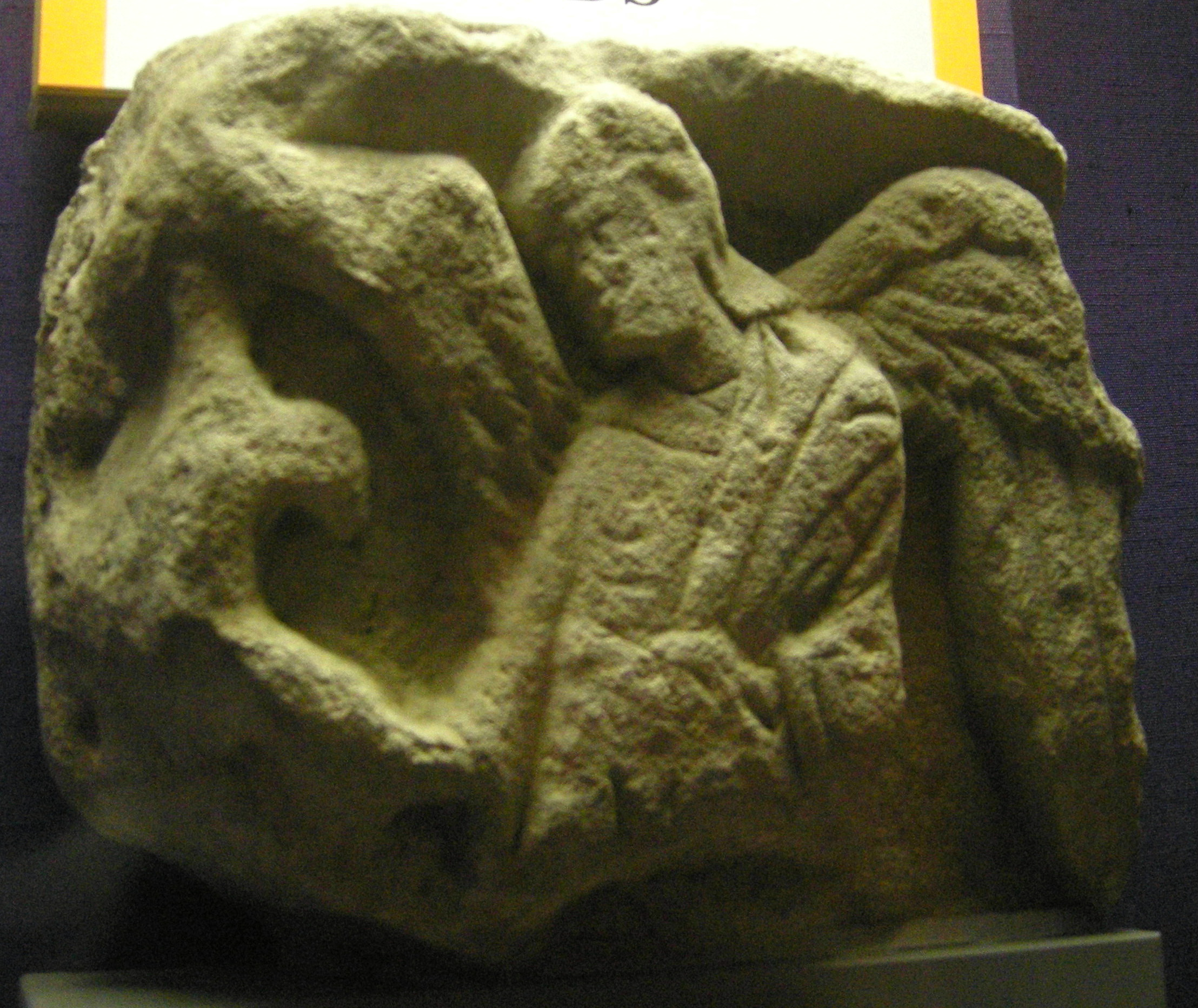
Anglo-Saxon stone carving

==== Anglo-Saxon Reculver ====
In 669 CE, long after the fort was abandoned in the fourth century, King Egbert granted land to the priest Bassa to build Reculver church. Most of the church was pulled down in 1809 leaving two towers as navigational aids, and sea erosion has removed half of the fort. Anglo-Saxon finds include a large glass beaker with tears found at Broomfield in 1830, a fifth or sixth century wheel-made pottery bowl known as the Marshside Bowl found by the son of farmer Jack Harbour, and a large blue glass bead found near Reculver.

=== Victorian seaside resort history ===
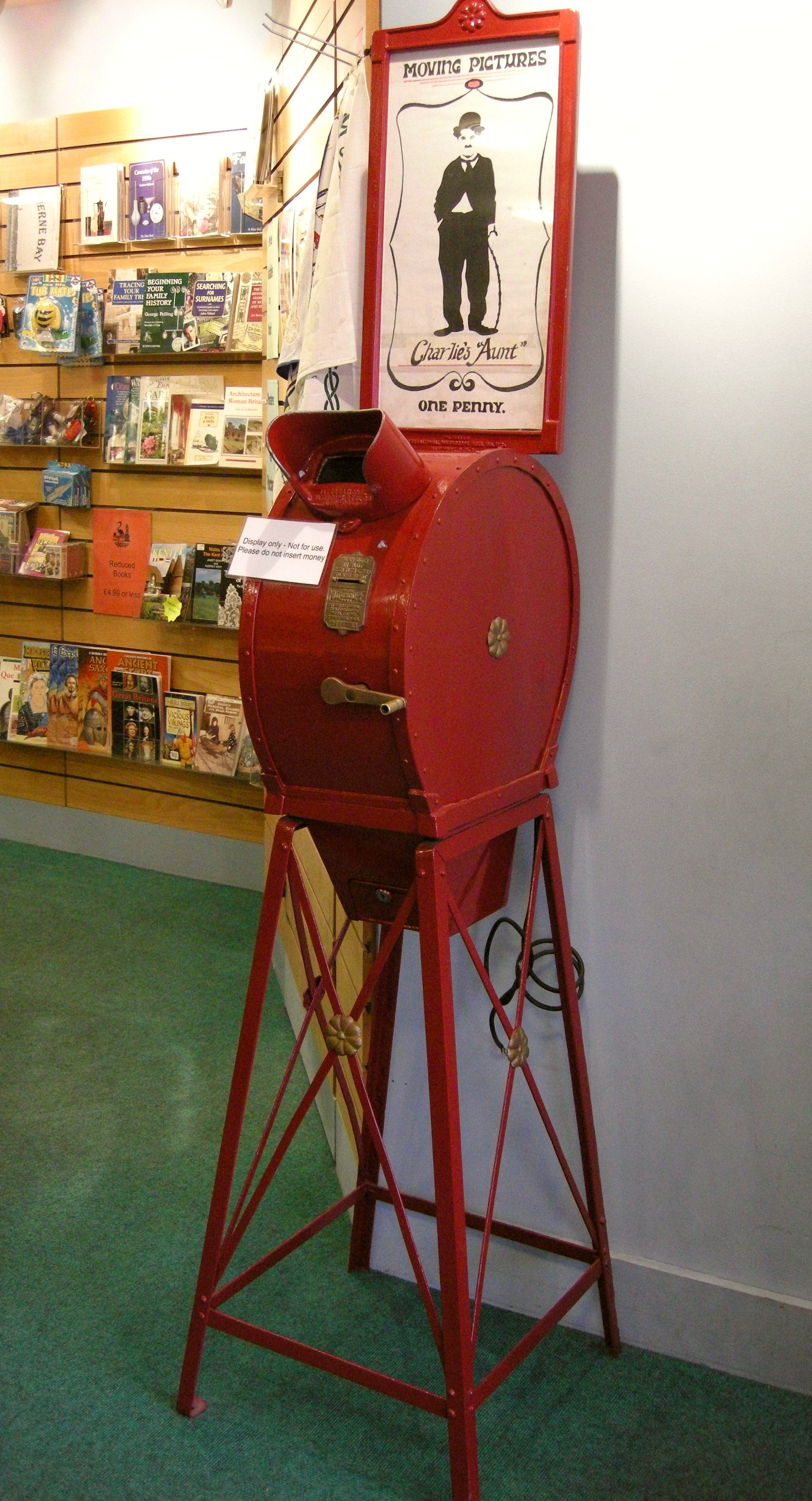
What-the-butler-saw arcade machine

==== Penny licks ====
During the 19th century ice began to be shipped from the Arctic and ice-cream kiosk owners spotted the potential. The first ice-cream cones were glass, and held a penny-worth or "penn'orth" of ice cream. Barrow-men did not have the facilities to wash the glasses properly, so they just wiped them. This resulted in a ban on penny licks in 1926 for reasons of hygiene.

==== What-the-butler-saw arcade machine ====
This mutoscope or What the Butler Saw arcade machine is possibly Edwardian. These tourist amusements used a set of flicking cards containing sequential photographs to simulate moving pictures; they were cheap attractions in the entrances to indoor amusement arcades on piers or on the seafront. They tended to contain quaint and voyeuristic flicks: a typical one still in use at Southend pier in 1963 had a butler peeping through a keyhole to see his lady employer showing her ankles and voluminous bloomers.

==== Wall displays ====
Displays show early photographs of the town as a seaside resort, of local events and of the development of the museum. There is a story about a girl awarded a medal for saving her sister from drowning in the sea. Photographs show the history of the fire brigade, the old bathing station and the clock tower.

=== Local history ===
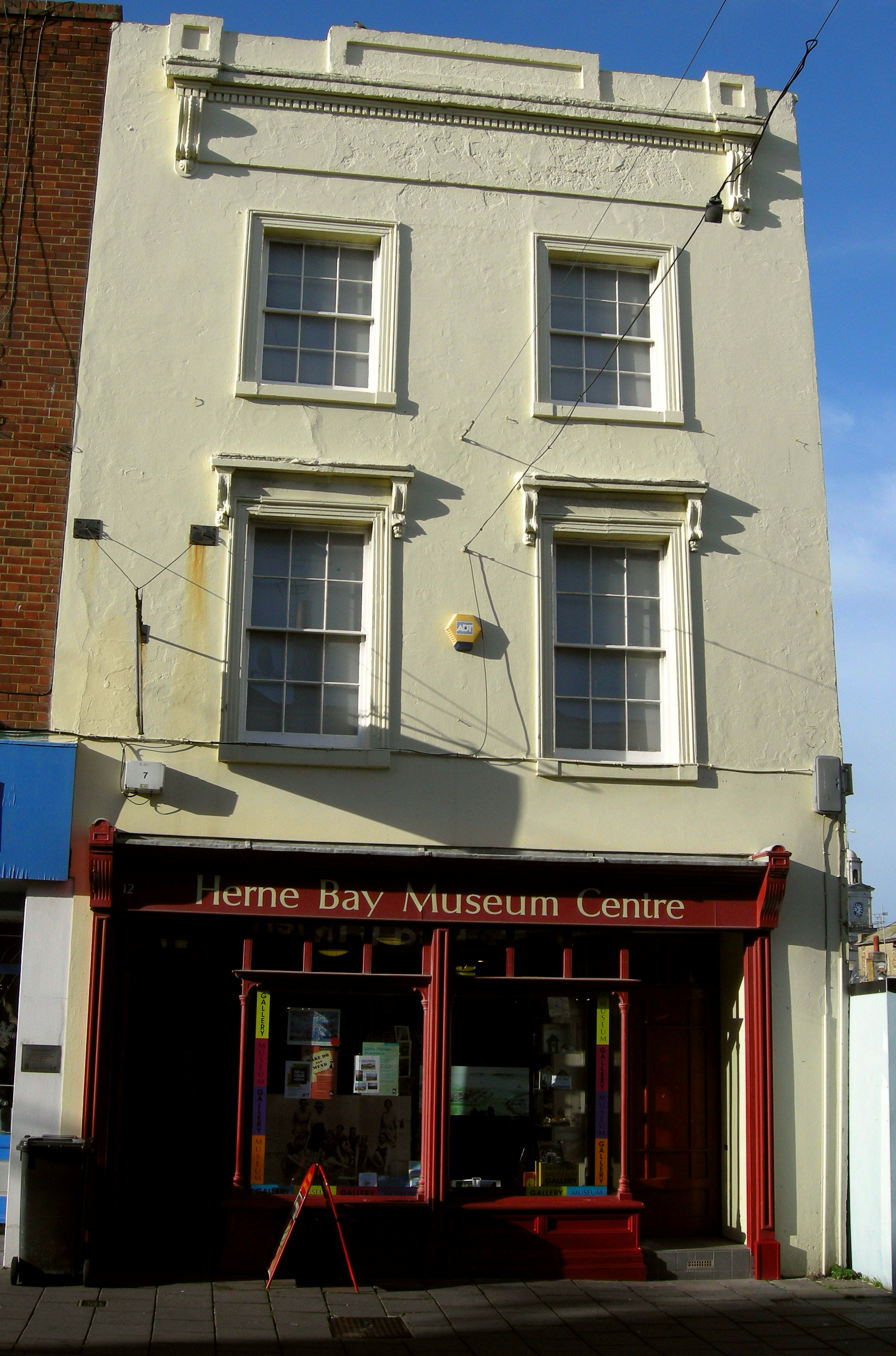
Classic Georgian premises in Conservation Area

Exhibits include a model of a pumping engine made by the engineer-in-charge and dated 1884 from Ford waterworks, Herne Bay Waterworks Company. There is a decorative seal press used by Herne Bay Urban District Council until 1974, which was used to impress the official seal on documents; the accompanying die is dated 1880s. Some exhibits give coverage of Herne Bay's wartime history, and they include a baby's gas mask, dated 1939. Among social history exhibits there is a spinning wheel for wool which is now in disrepair, but its previous repairs reflect the 1950s art-movement revival of spinning and weaving, and that revival features in an exhibit of woven items at Bradford Industrial Museum. This Saxony wheel is accompanied by a lazy kate: a set of spools for hand-plying yarn.

== Gallery ==
The museum holds paintings by local artists Thomas Sidney Cooper and William Sidney Cooper who painted sheep and cattle in the countryside around Herne Bay. The Art Gallery has a collection which focuses on local views and on work by artists connected with the area. Workshops involving practising artists and related to the changing special exhibitions programme are planned for schools as a further focus on making art. There was an exhibition of paintings and prints by local artist Paul Mitchell in December 2009.

== Exhibitions ==
There was an exhibition about the colour blue in February and March 2008. An exhibition about the cartoonist Giles took place in summer 2009. The Herne Bay Living History community memories group contributes to some of these exhibitions, and The October–December 2009 exhibition was entitled "Make do and Mend", using local evidence such as photographs and memories, to show how everyday objects were re-used during wartime. Craft activities and quizzes for families take place in association with the exhibitions. The permanent Tom Bowes exhibition shows him as a wax model with his collection and books.

=== Story time and quizzes ===
There was a "Herne Bay at War" quiz for families from October 2009 to January 2010, and for under-fives there was a story-time hour once a month from January to June in 2009.

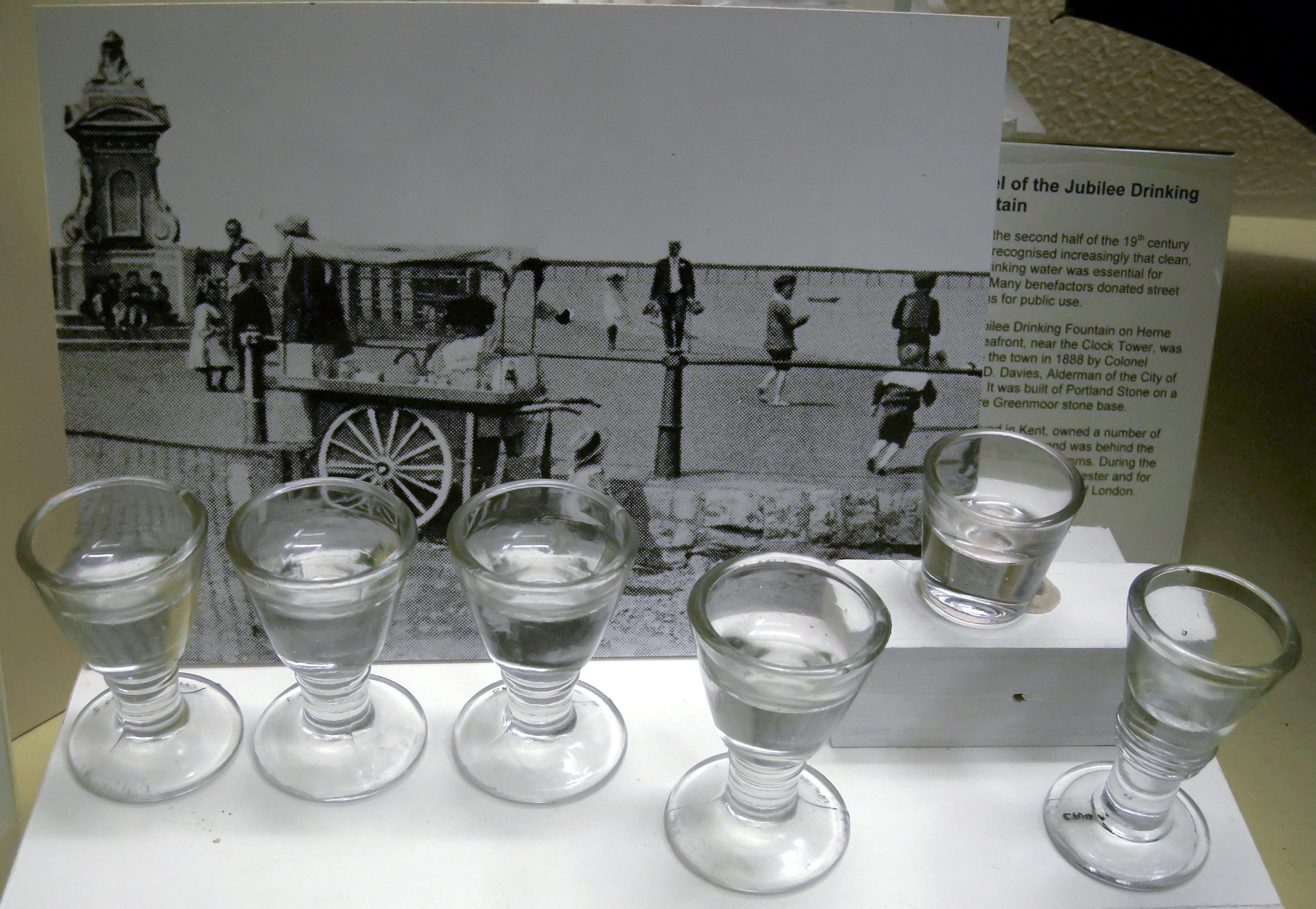
Penny lick glasses

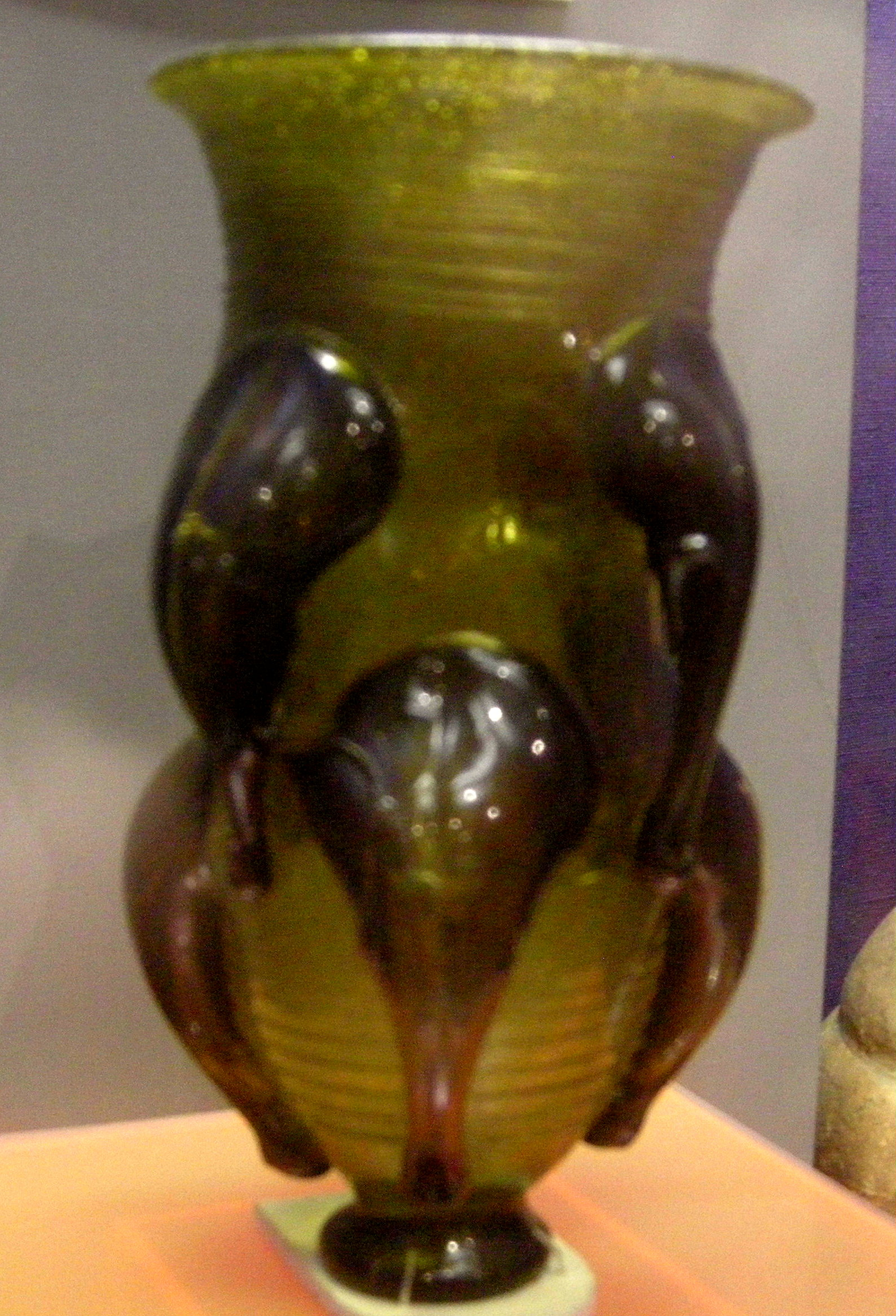
Anglo-Saxon glass beaker

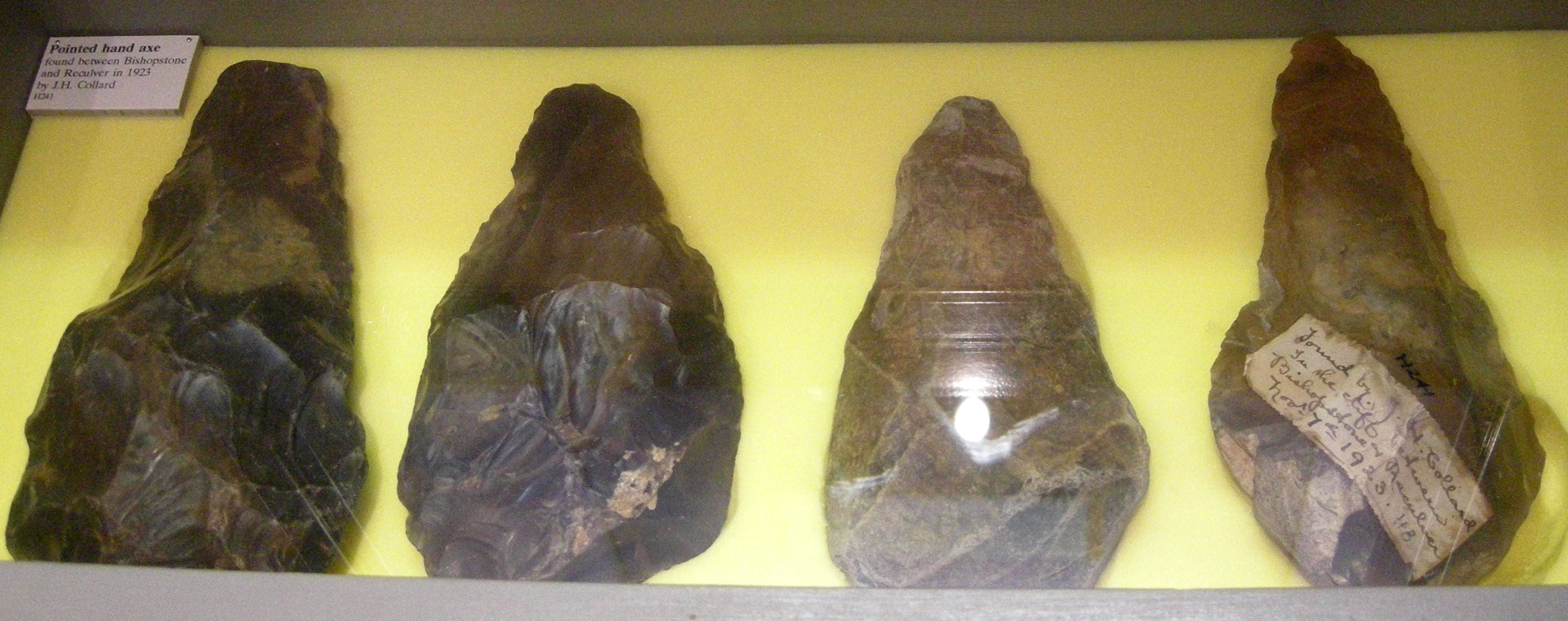
Ice age pointed hand axes found near Herne Bay

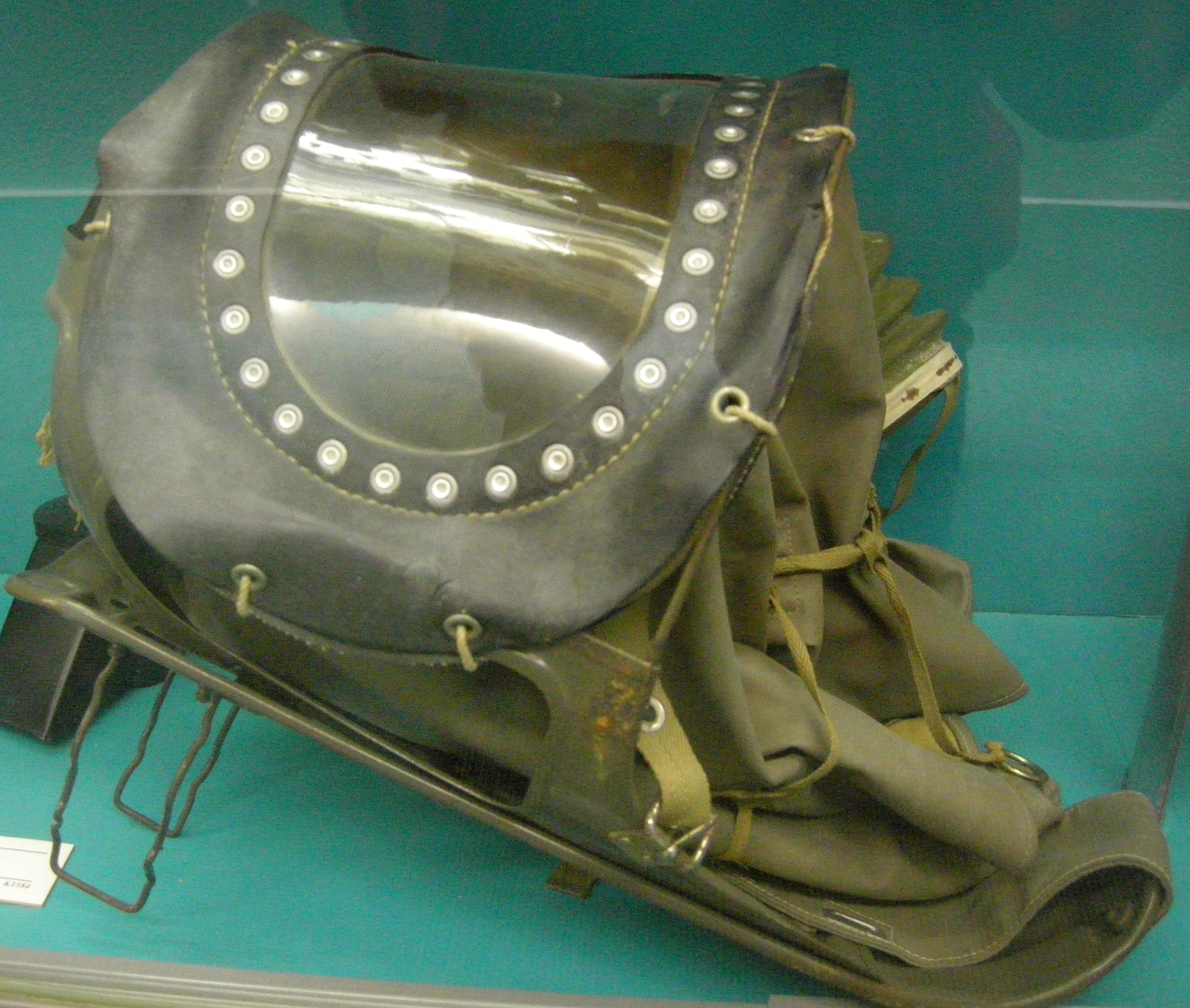
World War II baby's gas mask

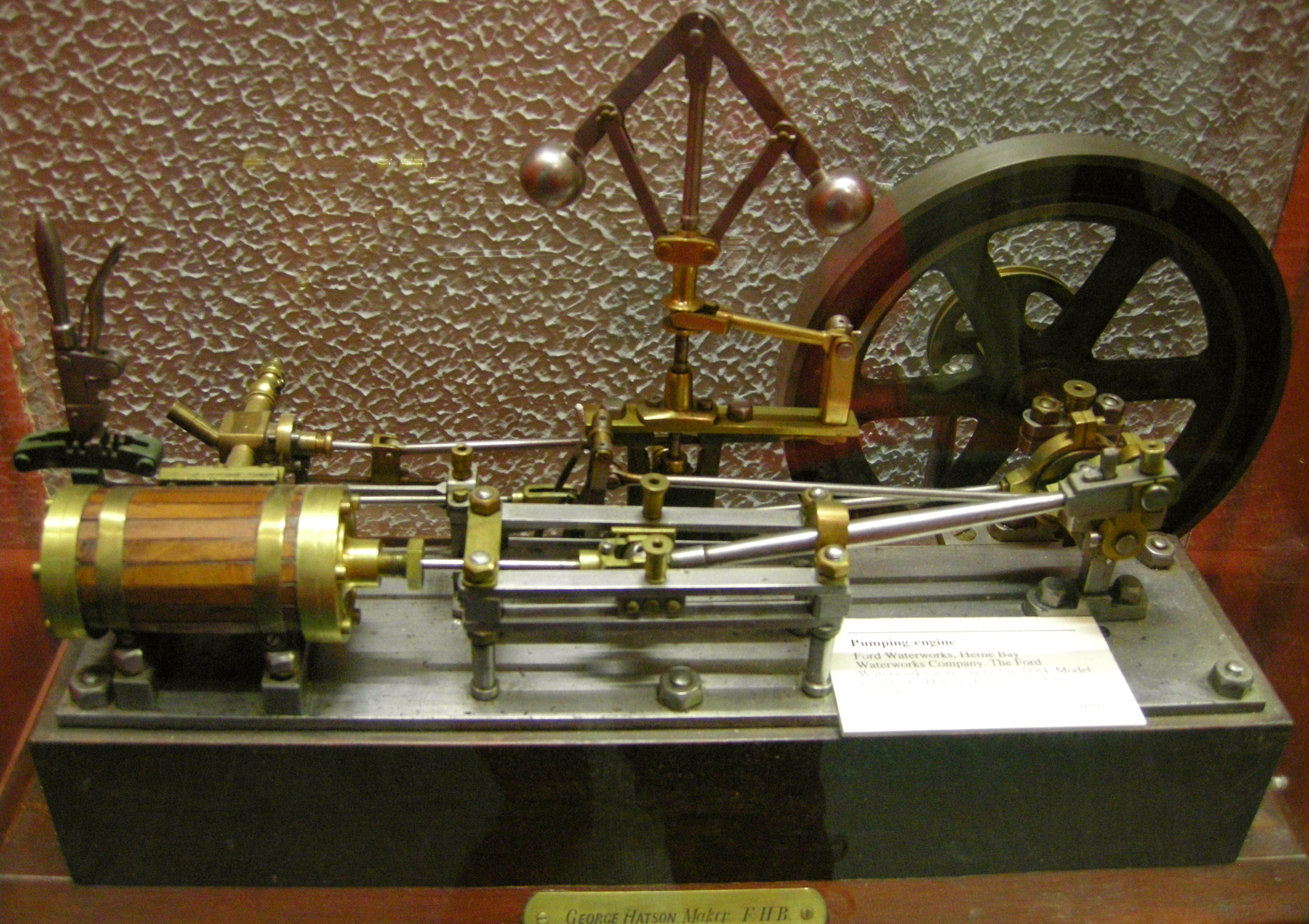
1880s model of waterworks pumping engine

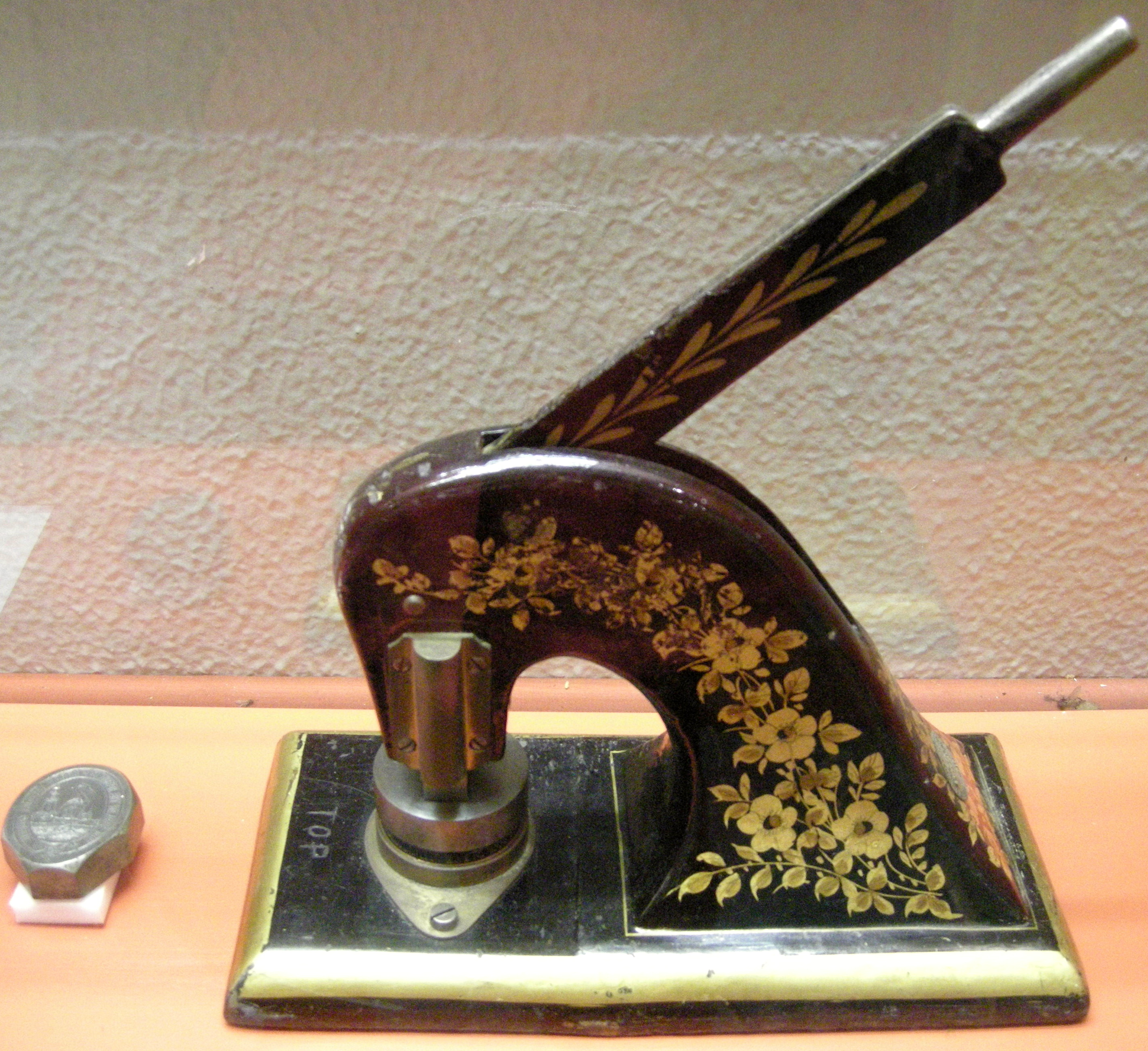
Official seal press

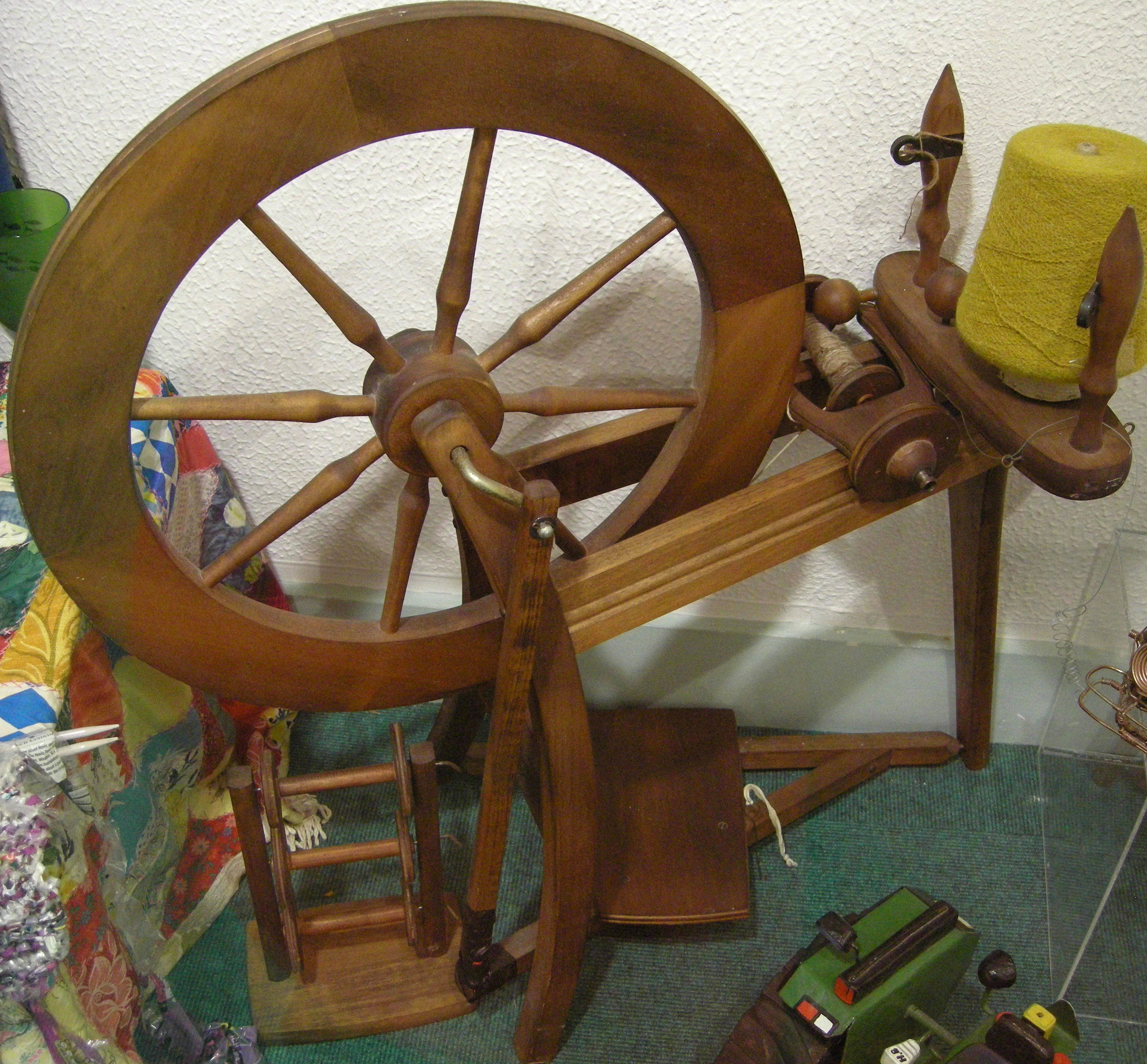
Saxony spinning wheel, part of 2009 "Make Do and Mend" exhibition

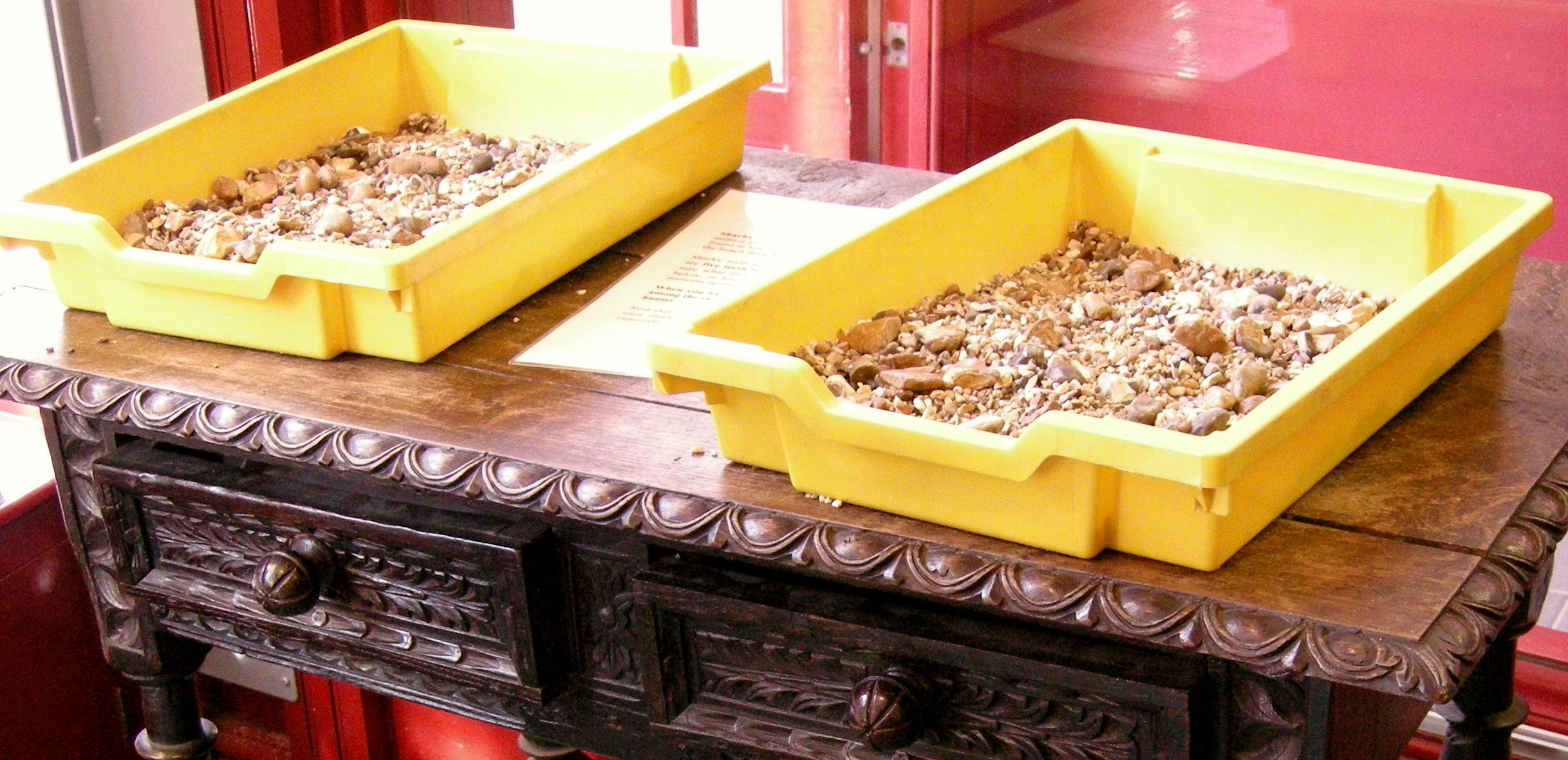
Search boxes containing coarse sand and fossil sharks' teeth

== Projected closure and saving of museum ==
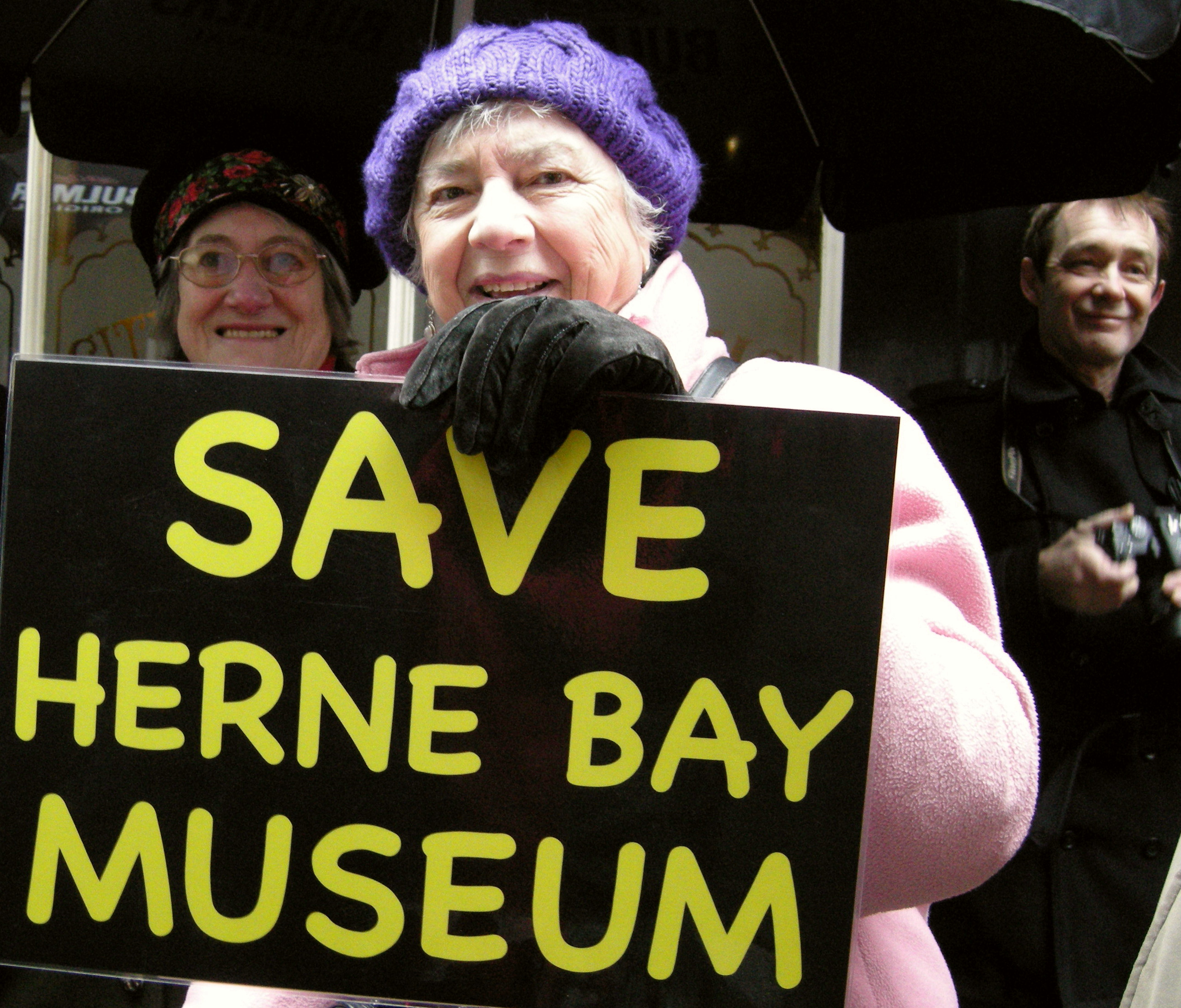
The Council budget threatened to close the museum in 2010, and a pressure group responded

=== Projected closure ===
The museum was under threat of closure as of 2009, pending a decision by Canterbury City Council on 18 February 2010. This caused widespread controversy. In the event the Council voted to close the museums in 2011, but said it would fund them for the financial year 2010–2011 whilst working with other organisations to examine ways of keeping the museums open.

=== Saving of museum ===
On 9 December 2010 the Herne Bay Times announced the saving of the museum, saying that 2,000 fans had fought back and that the Department of Culture and Enterprise had agreed to a rescue plan, as stated by Canterbury City Council's head of culture, Janice McGuinness. This was to be done by charging a £2 entry fee for non-residents; local residents and children would not be charged, although visiting schools would pay fees. There was to be "rationalisation within the service and more involvement with the community without".

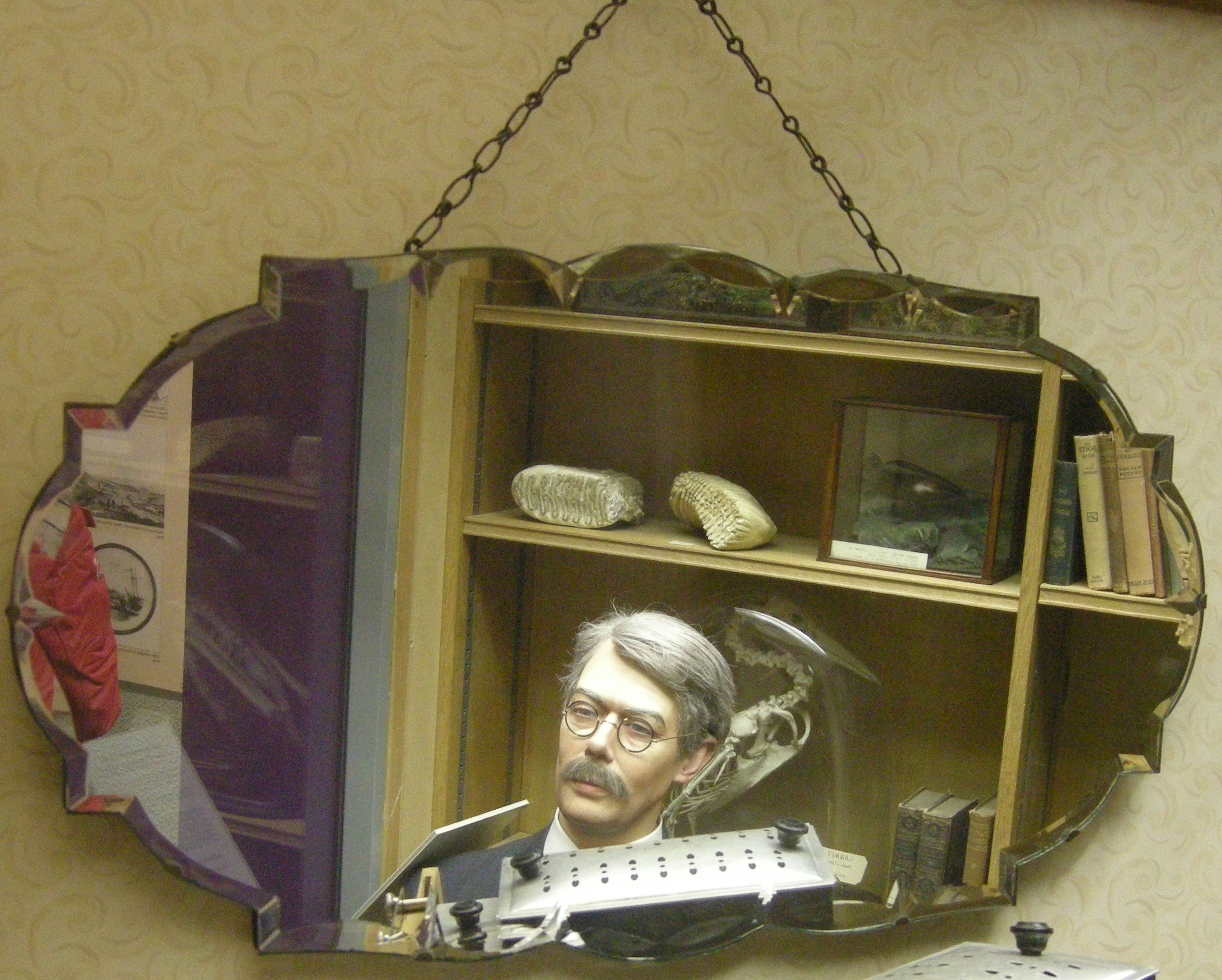
Dr Tom Bowes, who co-founded Herne Bay Museum

== See also ==
- Canterbury Roman Museum
- Westgate, Canterbury
- Westgate Hall, Canterbury
- Whitstable Museum and Gallery
