= Ruffinus =

Ruffinus may refer to:

- Rufinus (Roman governor), a governor of Britannia Superior, a province of Roman Britain
- Saint Ruffin, a mythical Anglo-Saxon martyr
