= Harold Eric Gough =

English historian and curator (1921–2008)

- Gough in RAF uniform, 1941
- Born: 9 April 1921; Herne Bay, Kent, England
- Died: 2 June 2008 (aged 87); Canterbury, Kent
- Occupations: Librarian; museum curator; historian; writer; lecturer
- Years active: 1947–2008
- Known for: Books on history of Herne Bay; President of Herne Bay Historical Records Society 1992–2008; Contributions to local history knowledge of East Kent

Harold Eric Gough (/ɡɒf/ GOF) (9 April 1921 – 2 June 2008) was an English librarian, museum curator, historian, writer, and lecturer, specialising in the local history of Herne Bay, Reculver, and Herne, Kent, England.

Gough, the son of a master bootmaker from Surrey, was born and lived almost his whole life in Herne Bay. Apart from five years serving in the Royal Air Force in the Second World War, he spent his career as a librarian in the same town. At the same time he dedicated his working life to the curation of Herne Bay Museum and to the Herne Bay Historical Records Society (HBHRS) which owned most of its exhibits and governed it. Most of his publications were aimed at informing the public of the local history and archaeology of the Herne Bay area, from the Stone Age, through the Roman era, the days of mediaeval Herne and smuggling, to the belated 19th-century development of the seaside town of Herne Bay.

Gough was a member of the Kent Archaeological Society, and as a field archaeologist took part in the excavation of the Roman fort, Regulbium, at Reculver in the 1950s and 1960s. As a member of the Herne society he supported the preservation of Herne Windmill.

== Background ==
Gough was born into a family which, apart from military service, had moved around south-east England. His paternal grandfather was Harry Gough, (Note: Harry Gough (Hoxton c.1853 – Yorktown, Camberley 5 August 1898). GRO index: Births Jun 1853 Gough Harry Shoreditch 1c 151. Deaths Sep 1898 Gough Harry 46 Easthampstead 2c 257.) a draper from Hoxton, London. Gough's father, Ernest Harry Gough, a master bootmaker from Surrey, (Note: Ernest Harry Gough (30 March 1885 – 12 January 1957). See 1939 Register. GRO index: Births Jun 1885 Gough Ernest Harry Farnham 2a 101. Deaths Mar 1957 Gough Ernest H. 71 Bridge 5b 48. He is buried in Herne Bay Cemetery, plot II, grave R19.) served for four years with the Canadian Armed Forces during the First World War, and was a special constable in the Second World War. In 1924, E.H. Gough's boot repair shop contributed to Herne Bay's carnival a float representing boot repairers.

Gough was born in Herne Bay, Kent, on 9 April 1921. (Note: Harold Eric Gough (Herne Bay 9 April 1921 – Canterbury 2 June 2008) GRO index: Births Jun 1921 Gough Harold S Muller Blean 2a 1871. Deaths 2 June 2008 Gough Harold Eric 87 Herne Bay (source: GreyPower Deceased Data. compiled by Wilmington Millennium, West Yorkshire.). GRO reference: Gough Harold Eric 1921 DOR Q2/2008 in Kent (5641P) Reg 1P005 Entry Number 500967400. Information on certified death certificate: Last address 141 Grand Drive, Herne Bay. Birth 9 April 1921 Herne Bay. Death 2 June 2008 Canterbury.) The 1921 England Census finds Gough at age 2 months, living with his parents at 31 William Street, Herne Bay, above his father's first boot shop. The 1939 register finds Gough as a library assistant, aged 18 years, living at 188 High Street with his parents Ernest Harry Gough, a master bootmaker, (Note: In the United Kingdom in the 19th and early 20th centuries, "master" (as in "master bootmaker") did not imply higher education and paper qualifications; it implied a high enough skill and reputation to pay employees and to employ apprentices, and to be called "master" in the workshop.) and Evelyn Annie Gough née Muller. (Note: Evelyn Annie Gough (East Grinstead 14 February 1885 – Herne Bay 1962). GRO index: Births Mar 1884 Muller Evelyn Annie E. Grinstead 2b 148. Marriages Sep 1915 Muller Evelyn A. and Gough Harold E. E.Grinstead 2b 399. Deaths Dec 1962 Evelyn A. 78 Bridge 5b 70.) From age 11 to 18, Gough attended Simon Langton Grammar School for Boys in Canterbury where he learned Latin and was inspired by local history. Later in life, as honorary curator of the Herne Bay Historical Records Society, he was able to translate a mediaeval Latin document for a Herne Bay resident in 1966.

Gough married Anne Maureen Prestwidge of Herne Bay, in 1948. (Note: Anne Maureen Prestwidge (born 1928). GRO index: Births Dec 1928 Prestwidge Anne M. Peskett Blean 2a 1462. Marriages Mar 1948 Gough Harold E and Prestwidge Anne M., Bridge 5b 162.) They had two daughters. In the 1960s he and his wife lived at 34 St Anne's Drive, Herne Bay, and their address in his latter years was 141 Grand Drive, one of the houses built by Lydia Cecilia Hill. He died in Canterbury on 2 June 2008.

E.H. Gough's shoe shop in William Street, 1920s

E.H. Gough (right) at his shoe shop in the High Street, 1930s

E.H. Gough's carnival float, with Gough age 3 (centre), 1924

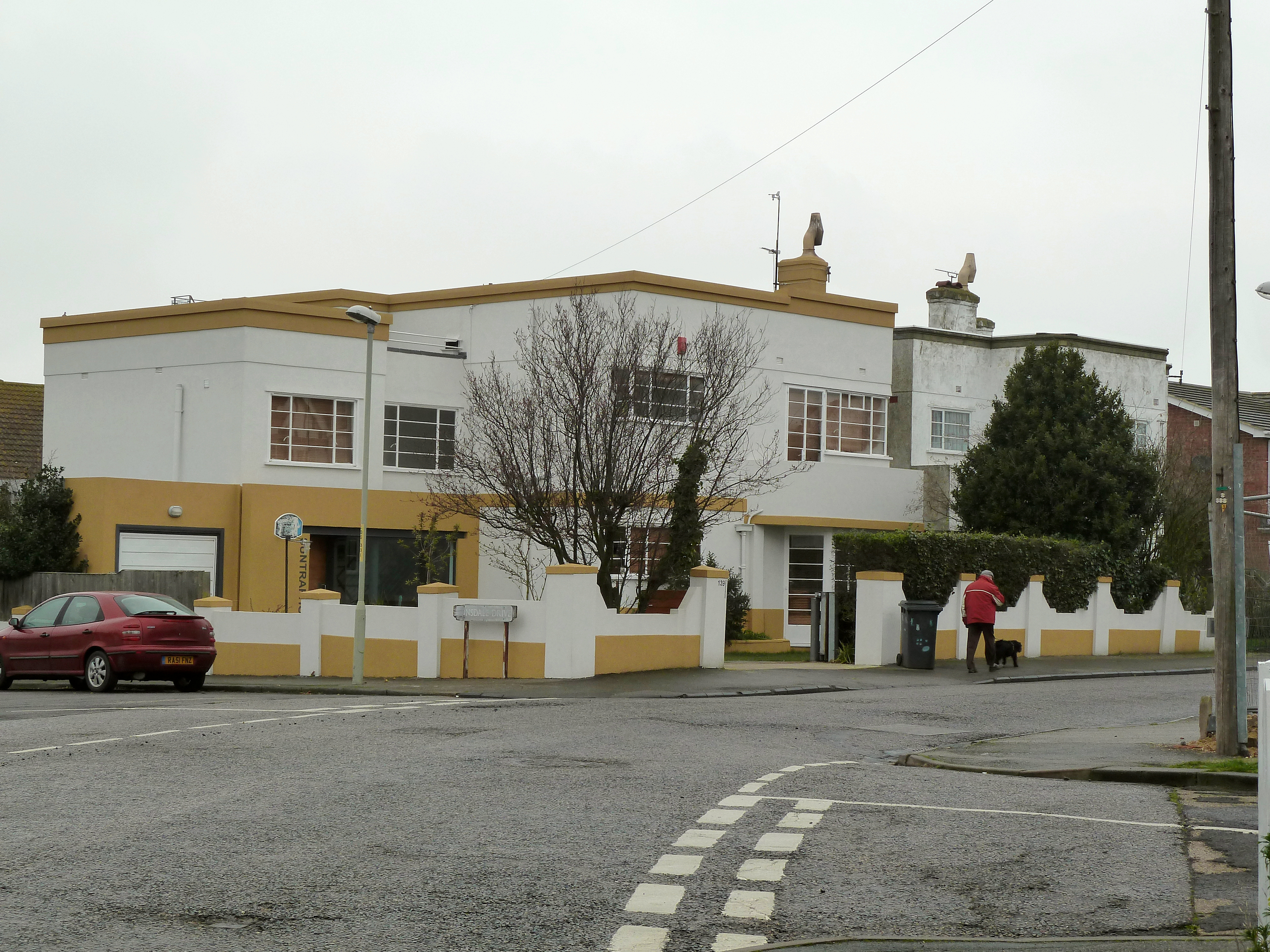
141 Grand Drive (right), in 2011

== Career ==
=== Royal Air Force ===
From 1941, Gough served for five years in the Royal Air Force ground crew during the Second World War. His RAF service number was 1334856 LAC Gough. He was demobbed in 1946. He was deployed with airfield construction squadrons in Europe, Iceland and Singapore. During that period it fell to him to pass on a signal, posting the bandleader Cyril Stapleton and his dance band to Iceland, and on one occasion Stanley Betts, Bishop of Maidstone, assisted him in washing the dishes. More seriously, he escaped injury when a blizzard forced an aeroplane backwards into a ditch, pushing Gough along behind it.

=== Kent County Council Library Service ===
Gough's entire civilian working life was spent in the employment of the Kent County Council Library Service. He started work at Herne Bay library in 1939. His constant presence in the library meant that the public could always contact him there on Herne Bay Historical Records Society business, such that he and the society "became almost synonymous", according to Herne Bay historian John Fishpool.

=== Herne Bay Historical Records Society (HBHRS) ===
This organisation was formerly named the Herne Bay Records Society (HBRS). Having worked unofficially as the museum's curator since 1939 (excluding five years' military service), Gough succeeded Tom Armstrong Bowes – at Bowes' behest – in 1949 as honorary curator of the HBRS, which was intricately connected with the town's museum and library. He served officially in that position for 59 years, between 1949 and 2008, and was the society's president from 1992 to 2008. Between 1949 and 1951, while Bowes was still chairman of the museum and library committee, the two men worked together. He was made an honorary life member of the HBHRS in 1968, "in recognition of his diligent work on behalf of the membership over the years".

Impressed by the extent of his historical knowledge, the council sometimes requested that Gough suggest street names for new local developments. He tended to be seen by the local newspapers and residents as a first-stop source of local historical knowledge. For example, when the new Women's Institute, Bleangate, section was formed in Herne in 1968, Gough was at hand to explain the historical source of the term, "Bleangate". When a post-Second World War bomb disposal team found two Napoleonic Wars era cannonballs offshore of the King's Hall, Gough had an explanation, tracing the event to an August 1813 military shooting exercise near the site of the present King's Hall. In 1975, builder Fred Palmer brought Gough a two-foot (0.6-metre) long mammoth tusk and some other ice age bones, which he had discovered half a mile (805 metres) out on the sands during an unusually low tide. In 1991 Gough "pieced together" for Herne Bay Gazette journalists the story of a preventive man, Midshipman Sydenham Snow, who died in a battle against smugglers. In 1999, The Lord Mayor of Canterbury, Jennifer Samper, presented to Gough a print of an 1817 watercolour of Reculver Church, by Denis Dighton,.in honour of his 50 years' curation of Herne Bay Museum.

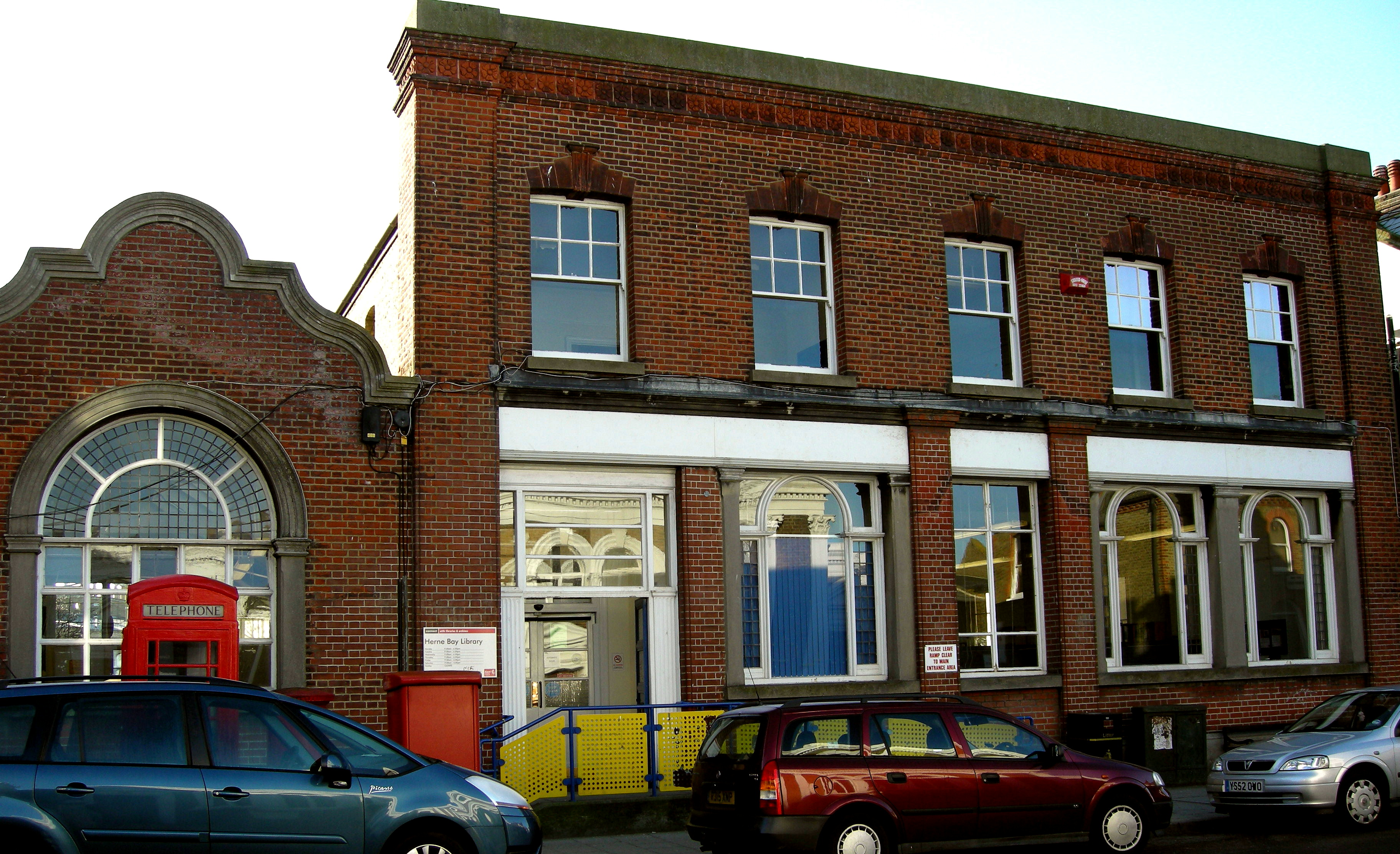
Herne Bay Library and former location of museum, 2010

Herne Bay Museum, in 2009

=== Superstition as a historical phenomenon ===
Although he said he was not superstitious himself, Gough showed an interest in the history of superstition. In December 1953, a thief broke into a showcase in Herne Bay Museum and stole items including a 500-year-old bronze ring, with the letter, "U", mounted on it. The ring was discovered by schoolgirl Sheila Atkins in 1934 in the remains of the demolished Hampton Hill farmhouse, near Herne Bay. Thereafter began the tales, as follows. After the child's teacher, her classmates and her parents handled the ring, they developed headaches lasting for days. Finding it in a drawer 19 years later, the child's father wrapped up the ring, carried it to Gough, and "warned him of its evil powers". Gough tried on the ring anyway. He told a London Evening News reporter, "For two days I had a dreadful headache ... A friend also tried it and he became violently ill – with German measles. Visitors to the museum have also asked to try it on, and have developed similar symptoms". (Note: Re the stolen ring: two ancient Greek lamps and an ancient Roman lamp were stolen at the same time. It is unknown whether any of the stolen items were recovered.group=nb)

On 16 June 1957 Gough and nine other Herne Bay citizens were invited to be radio guests. They were interviewed by Franklin Engelmann on the BBC Light Programme's, Down Your Way series. Each guest was permitted to choose a piece of music to be played, and Gough chose "Good-Bye" by Paolo Tosti. The song was composed by Tosti with lyrics by George Whyte-Melville in Herne Bay. Having learned that there were bad-luck stories attached to performances of the song, Gough wrote in 1957 to the London Evening News, asking for more information from readers.

... [The song] has a black reputation among theatrical folk, and in 1954 you printed a reader's letter detailing a whole week's misfortune following its performance in 1910. I invite readers to write to me if they have personal recollections of the effect of the song. Any letters associating it with good fortune would be equally welcome. My interest is not superstitious, but simply historical. Harold E. Gough, hon. curator, Herne Bay Records Society.

In 1968 Gough was assisting a young couple who believed that their house in Broadway, Herne Bay, was haunted, and who required some kind of historical explanation. The couple alleged that in 1916 a man had hanged himself from the bathroom window, and Gough was called in to do further research.

== Associations ==
From 1948, Gough had life membership of the Kent Archaeological Society, and was a member of its place names committee. He was deputy director of the Reculver excavation group, which investigated the Roman fort, Regulbium, between 1957 and 1969. In 1962 the archaeologist Brian Philp and Gough discovered 8-foot (2.4-metre) deep defensive ditches, containing flints, Roman pottery and burnt material at the fort. Gough was actively taking part as a digger, or field archaeologist, in 1966. He was one of the original members and vice chairman of the Herne Society, or Friends of Herne Mill, supporting its effort to preserve Herne Windmill. He was chairman of the Canterbury Family History Group for many years, and had membership of its umbrella group, the Kent Family History Society.

== Other activities ==
Festival of Britain pageant team, 1951

In Canterbury on 2 August 1951, during the Festival of Britain, Gough was involved in a celebratory procession of the towns of East Kent. Herne Bay's tableau recalled the charter of 949 CE, in which King Eadred, seated on St Augustin'e throne, granted the Monastery of Reculver to Archbishop Odo of Canterbury Cathedral. Herne Bay's tableau, funded by Herne Bay Urban District Council, won joint second prize with Whitstable. The charter was in the handwriting of Dunstan, Eadred's treasurer, and stated in Latin and Old Saxon that trespassers on the said land would be "forever damned". Gough, as secretary of the procession sub-committee, interpreted the charter, and "was able to state quite definitely that the area covered by the grant was almost exactly enclosed by the present-day boundaries of the parishes of Reculver, Herne and Hoath". He found that the monastery's land later became the manor of the archbishop, then the parish of Reculver. The parish was split into three segments in the 13th century, one parish being the parish of St Nicholas with all Saints. Gough assisted in the research for the costume design. Among the many tableau characters, Rev. E.G.A. Gardener, vicar of St Mary's, Reculver, was awarded the part of Odo, and Gough played the monk St Dunstan. Although it was his task to order the monks' costumes, he forgot to order his own tonsured wig, and had to hide his own unshaven head with a schoolboy's cap with the peak cut off. The Herne Bay team of 40 people repeated their tableau performance at the Herne Bay Carnival on 9 August 1951.

In 1962, Gough took part in Southern Television's Beat Your Neighbour quiz programme, in which his team won £500. The money was used to purchase and fit out a coach for the use of the elderly in Herne Bay. A large number of Herne Bay people travelled to various venues to watch the heats. For example, there were at least 300 of that town's residents in the studio audience for the Ramsgate heat on 26 March 1962. He was a member of the executive committee of the ratepayers' association in Herne Bay between 1961 and 1965. He took an interest in local postal history of postmarks, continuing the work of Richard Stanley which the HBHRS inherited. He reformed the work into a "comprehensive study", joined the British Postmark Society, and persuaded the town to design its own publicity postmark. In February 1969, when the Isle of Sheppey was expected to be shortlisted as a site for a third London airport, a pressure group was organised to object to such a plan, and its committee chose Gough as the delegate for its Herne Bay division. In the following month he saw fit to explain the situation in the Herne Bay Press.

== Lectures ==
Gough lectured on more than a hundred occasions in the Herne Bay area on the subject of local history, in the tradition of his predecessor Tom Armstrong Bowes, and he often used Bowes' lantern slides. Some of his lecture titles are listed below.

- "The summer excavations at Reculver", for the Central Townswomen's Guild, Herne Bay, April 1964.
- "The Village of Herne", for the Herne Methodist Young Wives, January 1967.
- "The Herne of two centuries ago", for the Young Wives Group at Herne Vicarage (Anglican), July 1967.
- "Herne Village of the Past", for Herne Toc H, 24 October 1967.
- "Know your local history", for the Young Wives' Group at Reculver, 25 July 1968.
- Short talk giving details of an iron pyrites nodule and a stone hand axe found at Bishopstone Glen, for the HBHRS, in 1970.

== Publications ==
The following is an incomplete list. Besides his books, Gough published articles on the subject of Herne Bay local history in books, magazines and newspapers, sometimes debunking local myths.

=== Articles, and letters to the Press ===
Gough debunked the myth that Herne's "Smuggler's Cottage" (right) was so named before 1908.

- In October 1950, Gough wrote to the Herne Bay Press, elucidating the origins of the Reculver monastery in relation to King Eadred and the Charter of 949.
- In December 1952, the Herne Bay Press quoted from a letter by Gough, discussing conjoined twins born at Herne in 1565.
- Gough, Harold E. (8 February 1963). "Letters to the editor: Smugglers' cottages". Herne Bay Press. p. 9 col.5.
- Gough, Harold E. (24 April 1964). "The days of the road tolls". Herne Bay Press. p. 4 cols 5–8.
- Gough, Harold (19 June 1964). "A Dickens mystery. Did novelist come to Herne Bay?". Herne Bay Press. p. 3 cols 5,6.
- Gough, Harold E. (27 November 1964). "Letters to the editor: Smugglers' cottages". Herne Bay Press. p. 3 col.3.
- Gough, Harold (1 October 1965). "Letters to the editor: Pagan Beltinge?". Herne Bay Press. p. 8 col.6.
- Gough, Harold (27 August 1965). "Beyond the Forest of Blean. Chapter II, Friction in the Church". Herne Bay Press. p. 5 cols 1–3. His source was a manuscript history written by E.L. Hasluck, and Gough's edition was published in the form of a series in the Herne Bay Press.
- Gough, Harold (16 September 1966). "Roman history under glass. What one may learn in the Reculver Room". Herne Bay Press. p. 7 cols 3–6.
- Gough, Harold (6 January 1967). "Pier history repeats itself!". Herne Bay Press. p. 3 cols 1–3.
- Gough, Harold E. (22 December 1967). "Obscure history of the Valiere family: part 1". Herne Bay Press. p. 3 cols 3–5.
- Gough, Harold E. (29 December 1967). "Obscure history of Valiere family: part 2". Herne Bay Press. p. 3 cols 1,2.
- Gough, Harold E. (27 December 1968). "Local history: the lighter side of numbering houses". Herne Bay Press. p. 11, cols 1,2.
- Gough, Harold E. (4 July 1969). "Church's 1300 years of history". Herne Bay Press. p. 6 cols 5–8.
- Gough, Harold E. (15 May 1970). "Herne Bay's market, in 1841". Herne Bay Press. p. 3 cols 1–3.
- Gough, Harold E. (17 August 1973). "Journalist's link with Herne Bay". Herne Bay Press. p. 20, cols 7,8. (Regarding the journalist George W. M. Reynolds.)
- "Writing on the wall for The Dolphin". Herne Bay Times. 29 March 1990. pp. 16, 17. Written by anonymous journalist, all information supplied by Gough, who is debunking a pub's purported history. (Note: The 1990 Herne Bay Times article, "Writing on the wall for The Dolphin" refers to the New Dolphin in William Street. Gough (via a reporter) demonstrates that the New Dolphin's history did not start in 1669. It's not even the original Dolphin, which "stood on the shore north-west of the Dolphin Hotel" according to the article. The old Dolphin was at risk due to development, and in 1831 the owners Cobb moved their landlady Ann White to what was to be the New Dolphin site in William Street, to start anew. Her sons succeeded her as licensees, then in 1900 Alfred Stroud was tenant.)
- Gough, Harold Eric (28 March 1991). "Enter High Jim, the hermit of Hoath". Bygone Kent. 12. Meresborough Books: 149–152.

=== Journals ===
- Gough, Harold (1984). "A Fresh Look at the Reculver Parish Clerk's Story". The Archaeologia Cantiana. 99 (6). Maidstone: Transactions of The Kent Archaeological Society: 133–138.
- Gough, Harold (1966). "Newly found brass from Herne". The Archaeologia Cantiana (77): 148.
- Gough, Harold (2001). "The Archbishop's Manor at Ford, Hoath". The Archaeologia Cantiana. 121. Maidstone: Transactions of The Kent Archaeological Society: 251–268.

=== Books ===
Books by Harold E. Gough

- Hasluck, Eugene Lewis; Gough, Harold (1966). Gough, Harold (ed.). Beyond the Forest of Blean: chapters in the history of Herne Bay. Herne Bay, Kent: Herne Bay Press.
- Gough, Harold E. (1966). The Story of St Martin, Herne (booklet). United Kingdom: British Publishing Co. Ltd.
- Gough, Harold (1967). The Story of the Parish Church of Herne.
- Gough, Harold (1983). A Picture Book of Old Herne Bay. United Kingdom: Meresborough Books. ISBN 9780905270661.
- Gough, Harold (1993). A History of Milling in the Herne Bay Area (2 ed.). Herne, Kent: Friends of Herne Mill.
- Gough, Harold (1995). Historical Guide to St Mary the Virgin at Reculver. Herne Bay, Kent: Herne Bay Historical Records Society. "Expanded edition of an original written in 1969 to celebrate the 1300th anniversary celebrations. Proceeds to church funds."
- Gough, Harold Eric (1995). Herne Bay Town Trail. A walk back in time. Canterbury: City Planning Department for the Herne Bay Festival. "Leaflet/booklet with historical trail map"
- Gough, Harold E. (1999). Herne Bay in Photographs (1 ed.). Canterbury, Kent: Canterbury City Council. ISBN 9781870844444.
- Gough, Harold (2008). Herne Bay's Piers, Herne Bay Past Series (1) (1 ed.). Herne Bay, Kent: Pierhead Publications Ltd. ISBN 9781904661078. "Published posthumously."
- Gough, Harold (April 2010). Mills and Milling in the Herne Bay Area, Herne Bay Past Series (3) (1 ed.). Herne Bay, Kent: Herne Bay Historical Records Society. ISBN 9781904661139. "Published posthumously."
- Gough, Harold; Fishpool, John (2011). Smuggling In and Around Herne Bay, Herne Bay Past series (7). Herne Bay, Kent: Herne Bay Historical Records Society. ISBN 9781909164062. "Published posthumously"

=== Publications in the Wellcome Collection ===
Note: Gough wrote over 40 articles for Bygone Kent in volumes 1–20. (Note: Details of Gough's articles in Bygone Kent are held by Herne Bay Historical Records Society.)

- McIntosh, Kinn Hamilton; Gough, Harold Eric (1984). McIntosh, K.H.; Gough, H.E. (eds.). Hoath and Herne : the last of the forest. K.H. McIntosh. ISBN 0950242373.
- Gough, Harold E. (1992). "A fisheries scientist". Bygone Kent. 14 (4): 248. "Letter"
- Gough, Harold E. (1998). "Conjoined Twins". Bygone Kent. 19 (5): 291–296. "Biddenden maids: Chulkhurst, Eliza, 1100-1134 and Chulkhurst, Mary, 1100-1134"
- Gough, Harold E. (1993). "The windowless Herne Bastille : the early years of the Blean Union Workhouse. Part 1". Bygone Ken. 14 (7): 423–427.
- Gough, Harold E. (1993). "The Blean Union Workhouse : the Medical Officer's report book. Part 2". Bygone Kent. 14 (8): 477–482.

Note: Gough also contributed some photographs to: Hawkins, John (1991). Herne Bay in Old Photographs. Stroud, Gloucestershire: Alan Sutton. ISBN 0862998913..

== Notes ==
Note: under the Births and Deaths Registration Act 1953, section 34, certified copies of birth, marriage and death entries carrying the General Register Office seal are evidence of the birth or death to which they relate. For verification, anyone can purchase such a certified copy of the certificate from the General Record Office.
