= Tom Armstrong Bowes =

British physician and antiquarian (1869–1954)

Doctor Tom Armstrong Bowes MRCS, LRCP, FSA
- Bowes in 1938
- Born: 30 November 1869; Herne Bay, Kent
- Died: 31 August 1954 (aged 84). Herne Bay, Kent
- Education: Gonville and Caius College, Cambridge
- Occupation: General practitioner
- Years active: 1897–1935
- Known for: Local history lectures; collection of ancient artefacts; co-founding Herne Bay Museum

Tom Armstrong Bowes (30 November 1869 – 31 August 1954) was a general practitioner in Herne Bay, Kent, England. He was a collector of historical artefacts, and an antiquarian, whose collection formed the basis of Herne Bay Museum.

Bowes was educated at Gonville and Caius College, Cambridge, and trained at St Bart's Hospital. As a physician, he worked in partnership in a shared surgery with his father Dr John Bowes, a major public figure in the small town, and his brother Dr Charles Kessick Bowes. He was known locally as "Doctor Tom" or "Tom Bowes", to differentiate him from his fellow practitioners. During the First World War he was an Admiralty surgeon.

Bowes is remembered today as an antiquarian, librarian, local history lecturer, and as a collector of ancient artefacts which formed the basis for the establishment of Herne Bay Museum (now the Seaside Museum, Herne Bay) in 1939. Many of the items were purchased by Bowes and not found by him, although he did go prospecting around likely archaeological sites during his holidays. The collection includes palaeoliths and ancient Roman artefacts, found in Kent. Many items were lost but the remainder are now held in the collections of the British Museum, the Herne Bay Museum, and the Herne Bay Historical Records Society (HBHRS). Some archaeologists and palaeontologists who assessed the collection have been frustrated by Bowes' obscure method of labelling his finds, but they accept that further research into this collection may reveal its value via new methods of assessment.

After praising him as a doctor, Reverend Ernest Roberts said at Bowes' funeral that, "He was essentially a scholarly and cultured man ... it is well that we should remember with gratitude the great contribution that he made to the establishment and success of the Herne Bay Public Library and Museum".

== Background ==
Bowes belonged to a family of professional men, and he worked in partnership with his father who was known for his public service in their small town. He was the third son of Dr John Bowes, (Note: John Bowes (Workington 22 April 1834 – Herne Bay 27 August 1909). GRO index: Deaths Sep 1909 Bowes John 75 Blean 2a 456. 1871 England Census for John Bowes (b.1835), wife and children) a Herne Bay general practitioner and surgeon from Workington, Cumberland. In Workington, John Bowes was apprenticed to a chemist, then received medical training at Guy's Hospital, and was awarded his Membership of the Royal Colleges of Surgeons in 1858. He founded the family medical practice at 7 Marine Terrace, Herne Bay, in the same year. According to his son T.A. Bowes, John Bowes occupied numbers 6 and 7 Marine Terrace between 1859 and 1908. From 1885 he worked for some years in partnership with Dr Alfred Rawlings who, like T.A. Bowes, was an antiquarian and "quite an authority on ancient Herne". He was chairman of the local Board from 1880 for 18 months. He was elected to Herne Bay Urban District Council, and was its chairman between 1897 and 1900. For 40 years he was the medical officer under the Poor Law, and public vaccinator, for the Blean Board of Guardians. He was created a justice of the peace for Kent in c. 1902, serving at Herne Bay Occasional Court and St Augustine's Petty Sessions. He was governor of Herne Bay Cottage Hospital until his death. Politically, he was a Unionist and a friend of Aretas Akers-Douglas. He was a member of the Primrose League, Chairman of the Herne Bay Conservative Association, and a Fellow of the Zoological Society (FZS). He retired from his medical practice in 1904 and from public life in 1908. According to the Herne Bay Press, John Bowes was a genial and kind man, esteemed by all. John Bowes' funeral was a major town event, with flags at half-mast and blinds drawn. The cortège included representatives of public bodies, medical men, justices of the peace, the Ambulance Corps, and police.

T.A. Bowes' mother was Hannah Bowes née Kitchin, an organist, and daughter of William Kitchin, a chemist and druggist employing 20 people including apprentices. (Note: Hannah Bowes née Kitchin (Whitehaven 6 February 1837 – Herne Bay 16 February 1917). GRO index: Marriages Sep 1859 Bowes John and Kitchin Hannah. Whitehaven 10b 666. Deaths Mar 1917 Bowes Hannah 80 Blean 2a 1625. 1851 England Census for Hannah Kitchin 1881 England Census, Whitehaven, for chemist William Kitchin employing 20 people, and grandson Tom Armstrong Bowes age 11 years.) She married John Bowes on 16 September 1859 at the Congregational Chapel, Whitehaven, and they had eight children. The family employed a governess, domestic servant, ladies' maid, a nursemaid and a cook, in 1879. His youngest brother, architect Harold McGowan Bowes, made drawings of many of Bowes' archaeological artefacts for lecturing purposes and records. (Note: Harold McGowan Bowes (1877–1967). GRO index: Births Sep 1877 Bowes Harold Mac Gowan.Blean 2a 742. Deaths Jun 1957 Bowes Harold M. 79 Bridge 5b 50. 1939 England and Wales Register.) His elder brother, Dr Charles Kessick Bowes, (Note: Charles Kessick Bowes (1862–1926). GRO index: Births Dec 1862 Bowes Charles Kessick Blean 2a 585. Deaths Dec 1926 Bowes Charles K 64 Blean 2a 1180.) was a general practitioner. His eldest brother, Dr William Henry Bowes, (Note: Dr William Henry Bowes {Herne Bay 1 July 1861 – Reigate 1922). GRO index: Births Jun 1861 Bowes William Henry Blean 2a 591. Deaths Dec 1922 Bowes William H. 61 Reigate 2a 251. William Henry Bowes was a twin, with Isabella Fox Kitchin Bowes (1861–1952).) a medical officer to the P&O Line, was a mental health specialist.

Bowes was born in Herne Bay on 30 November 1869. (Note: Tom Armstrong Bowes (Herne Bay 30 November 1869 – 31 August 1954). GRO index: Births Mar 1870 Bowes Tom Armstrong Blean 2a 773. Deaths September 1954 Bowes Tom A. 84 Bridge 5b 56. T.A. Bowes inherited his middle name "Armstrong" from his paternal grandmother Margaret Bowes née Armstrong (Cumberland 1801 – Cockermouth January 1848).GRO index: Deaths Mar 1848 Bowes Margaret Cockermouth 25 93.) His lecture Sixty Years of Herne Bay records that as a boy he would visit the nearby Bishopstone Glen to search for flint implements in the gravel on the cliffs there. He was home-schooled, then attended Epsom College, where he was appointed head prefect. There, he won the Martin Science Prize and the Watts Engledue Prize.

A.J.L. Bowes, son of Tom Bowes

In 1899, Bowes married Gertrude Anne Lee, daughter of George Lee of Fairy Glen, Herne Bay. (Note: Gertrude Anne Bowes née Lee (Herne Bay c.1872 – Bridge, Kent, 14 November 1964). GRO index: Marriages Mar 1899 Bowes Tom Armstrong, and Lee Gertrude Anne Blean 2a 1165.) In 1901 Bowes and his wife were living at 1 Malvern Villas, Herne Bay, with two servants. (Note: 1901 England Census for Tom Armstrong Bowes.) In 1911 Bowes and his wife were living at 7 Marine Terrace, with three servants. (Note: 1911 England Census for Tom Armstrong Bowes.) Following Bowes' retirement, he and his wife lived at 15 Queen's Gardens, Herne Bay, next door to Bowes' brother, Harold McGowan Bowes. (Note: 1939 England and Wales Register, for Harold McGowan Bowes and Tom Armstrong Bowes.) In 1901 Bowes was a lieutenant in the M company of the 1st Volunteer Battalion, the Buffs, East Kent regiment.

Bowes and his wife had one son, Flight Lieutenant Anthony John Lee "Johnny" Bowes of the Royal Air Force Volunteer Reserve, 149 Squadron. (Note: Anthony John Lee. Bowes (8 October 1913 – 24 July 1942).) He was an alumnus of Brighton College, of Charterhouse School and of Christ Church College, Oxford, and he gave a lecture about the Oxford colleges to Herne Bay townspeople in 1934. Like his father, he was an amateur entomologist and arachnologist. He discovered some new moths and butterflies. His papers are held by the Natural History Museum, London. (Note: A.J.L. Bowes diaries and papers Natural History Museum (NHM) GB/NNAF/P162038 (Former ISAAR ref: GB/NNAF/P32850). His moth discovery was noted in 1960 by P.E.S. Whalley. Oidematophorus bowesi Whalley, Ent. Gaz., 11:29 (1960).) He was offered a teaching post at Eton College but was called up in August 1940. A.J.L. Bowes was killed in action at the age of 29, over Holland in 1942, while piloting a Vickers Wellington. He is buried in Uden War Cemetery.

=== Death and funeral ===
Bowes died on 31 August 1954 at 15 Queens Gardens, Herne Bay. His funeral took place in Christ Church, Herne Bay's parish church, and he was buried in Eddington Cemetery, now known as Herne Bay Cemetery. (Note: Tom Armstrong Bowes (1869–1954) was buried in Herne Bay Cemetery, in Plot E, grave R-54.) At his funeral he was mourned as "a good man, a man of spiritual and intellectual culture – a somewhat rare combination". He left £14,412 9s 2d (equivalent to £342,542.99 in 2025). The funeral was attended by a large congregation. Besides family, friends and patients, the mourners included representatives of Herne Bay Urban District Council, and of the local branch of the Westminster Bank, the library committee, Herne Bay Records Society (HBRS) and the Fortnightly Club. The Reverend Ernest Roberts said, (Note: Rev. Ernest Roberts (c.1891 – 18July 1959) Vicar of Christ Church parish church and St John's Church, Herne Bay 1946–1959. He had previously been a missionary at Mbarara, Uganda.) According to the Herne Bay Press, "He was essentially a scholarly and cultured man, and while his modest disposition would not subscribe to any personal claims of success in public work, it is well that we should remember with gratitude the great contribution that he made to the establishment and success of the Herne Bay Public Library and Museum".

== Medical career ==
Part of Marine Terrace, site of the Bowes' practice

Model in Herne Bay Museum, of Bowes in his consulting room

Bowes studied medicine at Gonville and Caius College, Cambridge, from 1888. He gained his Bachelor of Arts in 1891, his Bachelor of Medicine, Bachelor of Surgery in 1894, and his Master of Arts and Doctor of Medicine in 1897. He was then appointed house surgeon at St Bart's Hospital, where he gained his Membership of the Royal Colleges of Surgeons (MRCS) and Licentiate of the Royal College of Physicians (LRCP) in 1895. In 1897 he went into partnership with his father and his brother Dr Charles Kessick Bowes, and joined the family surgery in his parents' home at 6 and 7 Marine Terrace, Marine Parade, on the seafront of Herne Bay, where Bowes continued to live and work until 1935. (Note: 1891 England Census for Tom A. Bowes, medical student, and his parents Dr John and Hannah Bowes, at 7 Marine Terrace, Herne Bay.) There he worked as a general practitioner. His surgery was at the back of his house, facing onto Charles Street. To differentiate T.A. Bowes from the other two doctors, he was known locally as "Doctor Tom" or "Tom Bowes". He would "quietly overlook" fees for patients who were struggling financially. Alongside his brother C.K. Bowes, he was medical officer to Herne Bay Cottage Hospital from 1897. He and his brother continued in the same medical practice after their father Dr John Bowes retired in 1904.

During the First World War Bowes was an Admiralty surgeon and a factory surgeon. Between at least 1910 and 1919 he was registered in the Navy List, working as a doctor from his surgery, for the sick quarters department of the Royal Navy, Reculver division. In 1917 Bowes had to take on the medical duties of his brother C.K. Bowes and of Dr Laurie, who were both temporarily ill. He also patronised charity works. For example he was a patron supporting a show on Herne Bay Pier in aid of blind soldiers and sailors at St Dunstan's Hostel in May 1918.

The 1921 England Census finds Bowes in private practice, with his wife and son at 6 and 7 Marine Terrace. (Note: 2021 England Census for Tom Armstrong Bowes and his wife, and son Ernest J.L. Bowes aged 7 years.) In a 1930 lecture, entitled "Sixty years of Herne Bay", he said that his work had "included attending to pet animals and birds as well as humans". He was described by the Reverend E. Roberts in his funeral oration as, "a man with a kindly heart, and very sensitive and responsive to the needs of others". By the end of his medical career Bowes was working in partnership with Dr J.R. Hamerton and Dr F.C. Cozens. According to the historian John Fishpool, he retired from his practice in 1930, although the records of the University of Cambridge state that he retired in 1935. The Herne Bay Press said that he was, "well-known and highly respected throughout the whole district".

== Antiquarian, librarian and lecturer ==
=== Collection ===
Flint tools from Bowes' collection

Paleoliths from Bowes' collection

Bowes was an active antiquarian and collector of historical artefacts during his medical career, and also after he retired. The Herne Bay Press said in 1954 that,

He was an expert in the remains of Roman Reculver, and his knowledge of the Stone Age flint implements of early man was indeed remarkable. On every holiday he pursued his search for these in every likely place – mainly in Kent – and amassed what is probably the largest collection of them in the country. It is now in the keeping of the Herne Bay Urban District Council.

Valentine Sinclair, a source of paleoliths

Bowes' collection was large, including ancient Roman pottery and stone tools which, from around 1900 onwards, were being rescued during gravel workings and building construction in the expanding town. Local knowledge that he paid workmen for these finds ensured that they were saved from loss or destruction. Patients would lend him their finds from beach and garden, and he would use his surgery lamp for close examination of those objects. Bowes' paleoliths were found at Reculver, Canterbury, Sturry, and the Stour Valley, Fordwich. Most of his Stour Valley artefacts were acquired via the Canterbury antique dealer Valentine Sinclair, (Note: Valentine James Sinclair (Canterbury 1874 – Canterbury 19 February 1929), a Canterbury photographer and antiques dealer at Northgate Street, Canterbury. GRO index: Births Mar 1874 Sinclair Valentine James Canterbury 2a 741. Deaths Mar 1929 Sinclair Valentine J. 54 Canterbury 2a 2029.) who had "extensive trade networks and contracts with several Kent quarrymen". Bowes benefited especially from the quarryman Robert Brett at the High Gravel Pit, Fordwich Hill Quarry. He took an interest in early fossils as well as all the pre-history and history of Man, and he communicated with other antiquarians, historians and archaeologists. As a physician, Bowes was able to advise the police, archaeologists and others about the conservation and identification of animal and human bones. When Herbert Newton Rainbow moved away from Herne Bay in 1925, he donated his own finds to Bowes, leaving Bowes with a "greatly enhanced" collection. The Herbert Rainbow collection was acquired by Rainbow between 1910 and 1925. He gained those artefacts mainly from Highstead, but also from the rural areas of Shelvingford, Marshside, Maypole near Hoath, and Brook, and also from Bishopstone and Reculver. All the Rainbow finds were "meticulously recorded". With regard to Bowes' whole collection, Peter Geoffrey Knowles assessed part of it in 2023, and commented in 2024 as follows:

The Bowes collection provides a valuable large sample of artefacts from the terraces of the Stour from which to understand the Palaeolithic settlement of southern Britain. Given Bowes's complete lack of attention to contextual niceties, however, on its own it can tell us very little. Understanding the Bowes collection relies on the work of others, both people in the past such as [Dr Frank] Ince, [Reginald Allender] Smith and [Henry] Dewey, who took greater care to understand the geology and sequence in the Stour, and workers in the present who have returned to these sites to provide up-to-date analyses of the sediments and context of the artefacts. Typically, though, modern investigations cut only small sections and find far fewer artefacts than were uncovered in the days of manual and steam-shovel gravel extraction, and it is here, used with due diligence, that the Bowes collection will come into its own.

=== Museum and library ===
For many years, while Bowes was serving in the medical profession, his collection was housed as a private museum in a schoolroom of Herne Bay College at St George's Terrace, with permission of its headmaster, and Bowes' lifelong friend, Captain Eustace Turner. (Note: Captain Eustace Whereat Turner, M.A. (Blean 1875 – Bridge 22 July 1947), headmaster of Herne Bay College, Herne Bay. GRO index: Births Jun 1875 Turner Eustace Whereat Blean 2a 732. Deaths Sep 1947 Turner Eustace W 72 Bridge 5b 43. Due to World War I, Herne Bay College removed staff and pupils for safety to Eddington, Kent in 1914, probably not taking Bowes' collection with them.) In 1932, following his retirement, he chaired a committee "to found an organisation which could undertake the systematic collection of objects of local interest and house them in a suitable building so that residents and visitors could become acquainted with the past history of the town". In 1933, under the auspices of Herne Bay Records Society, the museum and library was opened by Fairfax Luxmoore at 53 Mortimer Street, but the first visitors to the museum were admitted on 18 July 1932. By 1935, Bowes was leaving his surgery and retiring to smaller accommodation, and his collection needed a bigger museum to accommodate it. In 1936 Kent County Council took over the library, installed Bowes as first chairman of the library committee, and upgraded it to a fully staffed lending library. By 1937 the County Council had taken over the whole building: museum, library and all. Bowes remained for 14 years as chairman of the museum and library committee, and set up the museum on the floor above the library with books on archaeology and local history. Museum visits were suspended from 6 December 1939, due to the Second World War. Herne Bay historian Harold Eric Gough was elected as curator of Herne Bay Museum in 1949, so Gough and Bowes were working together until 1951 when Bowes retired from his post.

In Bowes' lifetime his collection consisted of 3,793 objects in 17 glass cases. The museum's archive in the basement of Mr and Mrs Stone's house was flooded by a storm and high tide on 12 February 1937, and again in the basement of the Herne Bay Museum in 1949 and 1953. Many artefact labels were lost, (Note: In 2019, the palaeontologist and researcher Pete Knowles posted on Facebook an appeal to find the missing artefacts.) and because Bowes published little about his collection, it has played almost no part in recent academic assessment of the Palaeolithic record. Following the 1953 flood, Bowes' collection was stored in a chicken shed and, according to the Antiquaries Journal, much of the material was "widely dispersed". Today, Herne Bay Museum's collection holds 185 of the items, and the British Museum has held in its collection 1,479 of them since 1963. By the 2020s the rest could not be found. Peter Geoffrey Knowles discovered that the HBHRS collection holds the following items: Bowes' newspaper cuttings and ephemera of 1921–1951, his private recording system for found artefacts, evidence of the cataloguing of the Fordwich specimens now held by the British Museum, and a large number of the missing palaeoliths.

Herne Bay College (left, background) which housed Bowes' private museum, until 1914

Part of Bowes' private museum in Oddfellows Hall, in 1932

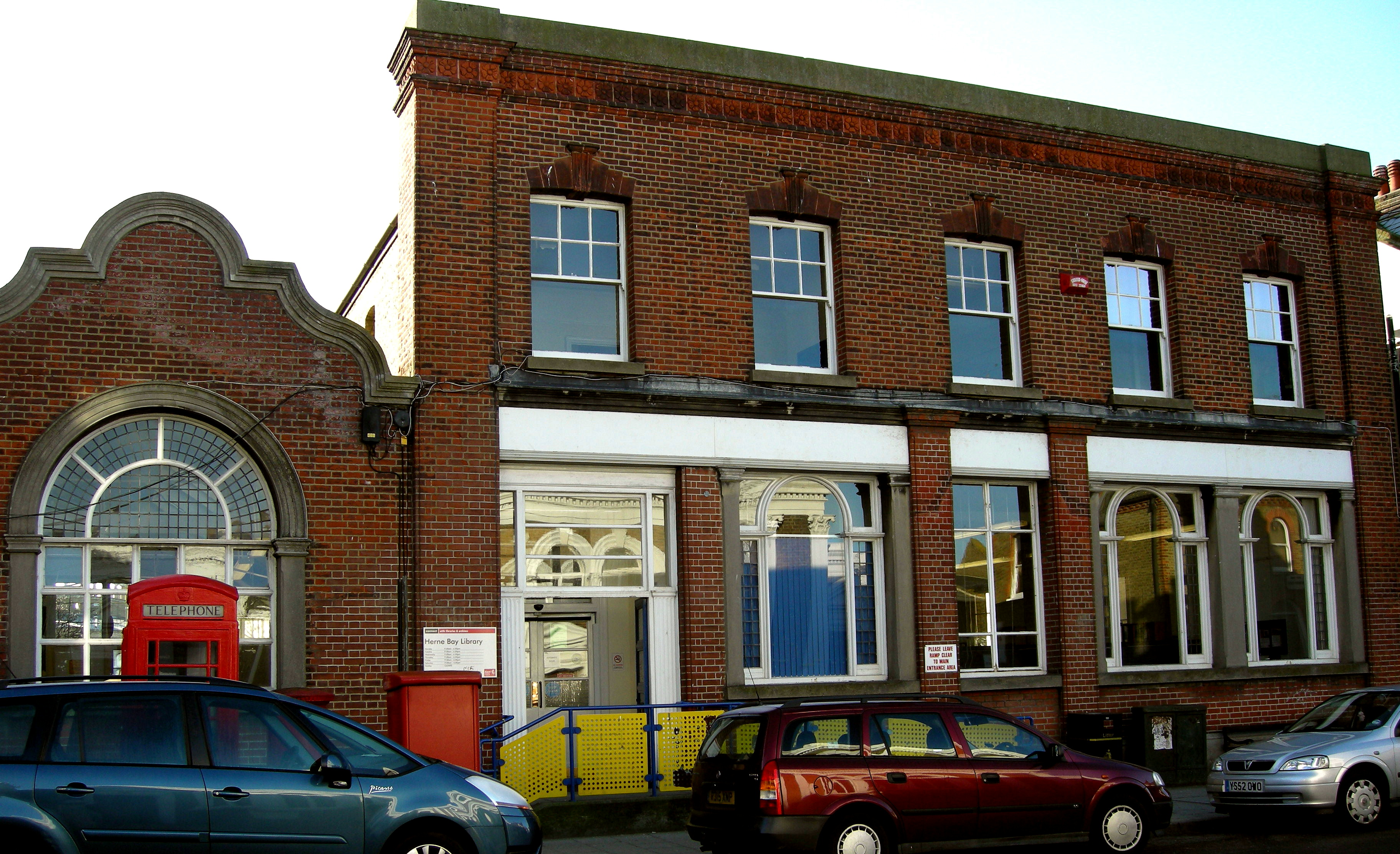
Herne Bay Library housed the museum upstairs, 1939–1996

The Seaside Museum, which has housed 185 items of Bowes' collection, from 1996

=== Lectures ===
Between the 1920s and the late 1940s, Bowes lectured on the subject of local history and archaeology, using his collection of 395 magic lantern slides. The slides were made by T.A. Bennett and as of 2024 were still in the possession of the HBHRS. According to John Fishpool and the Herne Bay Press, those lectures were "highly popular" and drew "large audiences". The following is a selection of his lecture titles, which reveal part of the range of his research. He spoke on "Some spiders" at the Parochial Institute, Herne Bay, on 22 October 1931. He also discussed "Hunting the Musk Rat", a local pest, at the Parochial Hall on 16 November 1933. and again at the public library on 16 January 1941. The musk rat was imported from Canada to England in 1929, escaped, then was hunted by Bowes and others as a nuisance. From his collection of fossils and research he produced a talk on "Beasts that have perished" at the Parochial Institute on 16 March 1939.

However Bowes' most popular and repeated subject was local history. His lecture on "Herne Bay in pre-Victorian Times" was given at the Parochial Institute on 17 and 18 November 1927, and the newspaper report of it covered several pages of the Herne Bay Press. He spoke on "The Story of Herne Bay" at the King's Hall on 13 October 1934, and "Ye Olde Herne Bay" at St John's Church Hall on 23 March 1939. He gave a talk on "Old Herne Bay" at the public library on 2 July 1941, at the Methodist Church on 16 December 1936, and "Herne Bay in the Past" at Hillborough Women's Institute in January 1946. A variation on this theme was "The Sea Front at Herne Bay", a talk given at the Parochial Institute on 1 October 1945. He gave at least one separate lecture on "Herne Mill and Others" at Herne Bay Library on 16 October 1941. He was able to give unique lectures on local archaeology. He gave a talk on "Roman Burials at Ford" for Herne Bay Literary and Social Society on 20 October 1921, and on "Roman Pottery" at the Library and Museum on 14 December 1933. This lecture, ad-libbed from notes by Bowes, was transcribed verbatim by a journalist.

In 1954 the Herne Bay Press said that Bowes was, "a great authority on the history of Herne Bay about which he gave many lectures profusely illustrated with lantern slides. The latter are still among the most prized possessions of the Record Society".

== Associations and awards ==
Bowes was elected a Fellow of the Society of Antiquaries, and he was a member of other learned societies.. In 1931 or 1932 he and Joseph Lewin Payne, a dentist and historian, (Note: Joseph Lewin Payne, O.B.E., M.R.C.S., M.R.C.P., L.D.S., (Eng.) (Lambeth 1872 – Marylebone 31 January 1939). GRO index: Births Dec 1872 Payne Joseph Lewin Lambeth 1d 432. Deaths Mar 1939 Payne Joseph L 66 Marylebone 1a 702.) co-founded the Herne Bay Records Society (HBRS), later known as the Herne Bay Historical Records Society (HBHRS), and he was elected president, serving between 1949 and 1951, and served as its chairman for 18 years. With the society he co-founded Herne Bay Museum and its library. For some years he was a member of the library committee. When he donated a large proportion of his collection to the society in 1936, it was displayed at the museum, which was at that time housed in the Oddfellows Hall (and former Plymouth Brethren chapel) at 53 Mortimer Street, Herne Bay.

When he was a young man, Bowes and his family took part in amateur theatricals for charity, including the drama A Wonderful Woman at Herne Bay Town Hall in 1893, in aid of The Bird's Nest, a children's charity. He was a member of Herne Bay's tennis club from at least 1898, and served on its committee in 1900. He served on the committee of the Herne Bay branch of the Primrose League from at least 1907. For 25 years Bowes was a member of Herne Bay's Fortnightly Club, and served as its president between 1943 and 1951. He gave 19 lectures there, and read to the club "many papers sometimes on archaeological or scientific subjects and he was equally entertaining in lighter vein". He had membership of the town's branch of the Conservative Party, its cricket club and its Bible Society. However he had to curtail those activities in his last years, due to being "severely handicapped" by failing eyesight. He resigned from the Herne Bay Historical Society in 1951 on health grounds. Unlike his brother and father, he did not perform civic duties in the town. He was a religious man who attended Herne Bay's Anglican parish church, Christ Church in William Street, for 80 years.

== Publications ==
- Bowes, A. (October 1928). "Palaeoliths found in England". The Antiquaries Journal. 8 (4). University of Cambridge: 517–518. doi:10.1017/S0003581500093173.
- Bowes, A. (July 1929). "Another flint from Sturry". The Antiquaries Journal. 9 (3). University of Cambridge: 245–246. doi:10.1017/S0003581500093355.
- Bowes, A. (July 1939). "A remarkable flint core". The Antiquaries Journal. 19 (3). University of Cambridge: 317–318. doi:10.1017/S0003581500007885.

== Notes ==
Note: under the Births and Deaths Registration Act 1953, section 34, certified copies of birth, marriage and death entries carrying the General Register Office seal are evidence of the birth or death to which they relate. For verification, anyone can purchase such a certified copy of the certificate from the General Record Office.
