= Kōrikoppu =

Glassware mainly used for Japanese shaved ice

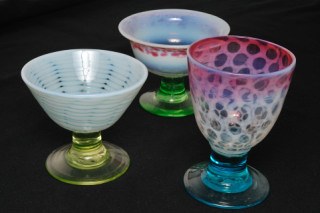
Kōrikoppu

Kōrikoppu (氷コップ) (ja) is dedicated glassware which was mainly used for Kakigōri (かき氷, Japanese shaved ice) before World War II in Japan.

Early Kōrikoppu could be found by the end of the Meiji period (1868–1912), and individual texture patterns using a technique of aburidashi (a technique of glass-works that motifs come to the surface by difference in temperature) were developed until the beginning of the Shōwa period (1926–1989).

== See also ==
- Penny lick - an old small glass for serving ice cream in U.K.
