= Penny lick =

Small glass for serving ice cream

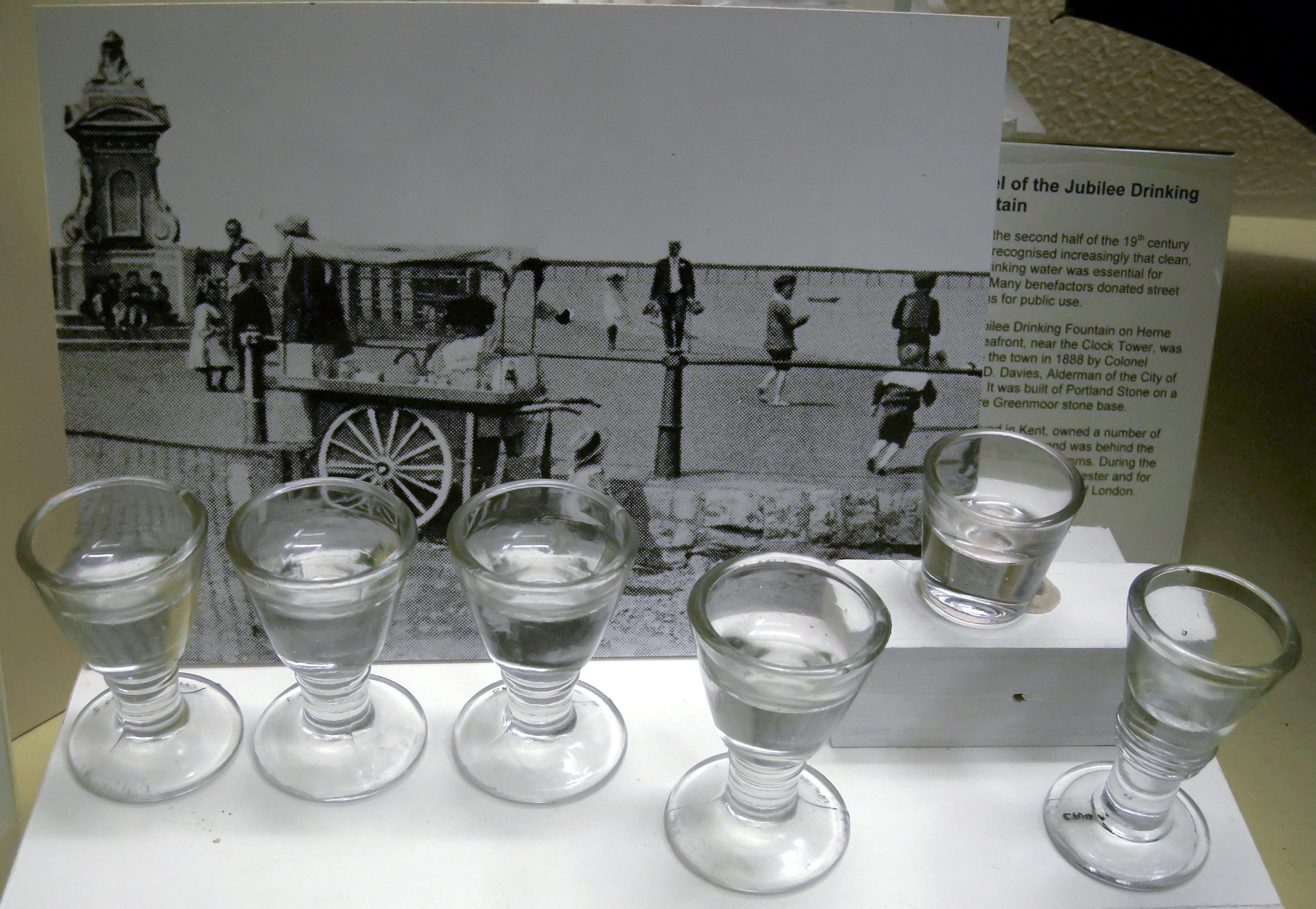
19th-century penny lick glasses

A penny lick was a small 7 ounce glass which held about 1 ounce used for serving ice cream, used in London, England, and elsewhere in the late nineteenth century and early twentieth century. Street vendors would sell the contents of the glass for one penny. The glass was usually made with a thick glass base and a shallow depression on top in which the ice cream was placed. The customer would lick clean the glass and return it to the vendor, who would reuse it.

The thickness of the glass made the contents appear greater than they were, often disappointing the customer, and the glasses commonly broke or were stolen.

The penny lick was banned in London after 1899 due to concerns about the spread of disease, particularly cholera and tuberculosis, as the glass was often not washed between customers. Questions of hygiene led Italo Marchiony to introduce a pastry cup in New York City in 1896, which he patented in 1903. The waffle ice cream cone rapidly became popular soon afterwards, displacing the penny lick.

== See also ==
- Hokey pokey
- Kōrikoppu, Japanese old unique glassware for shaved ice
- Carlo Gatti
- Agnes Marshall
