= Regulbium =

Roman fort in Kent, England

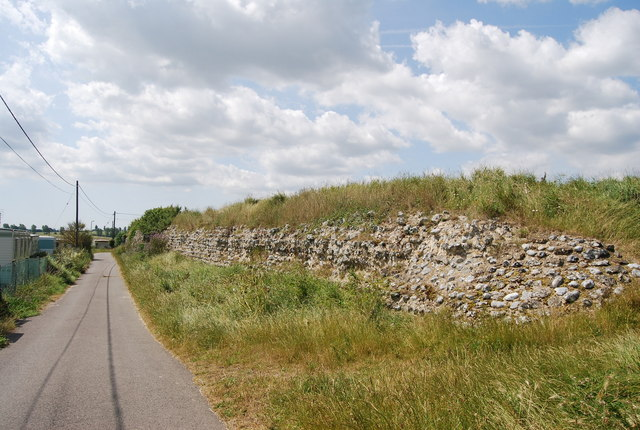
- Remains of the perimeter wall of Regulbium Roman Fort

- Location within Kent
- 51.379°N 1.200°E
- Location: Reculver, Kent, England

Regulbium was the name of an ancient Roman fort of the Saxon Shore in the vicinity of the modern English resort of Reculver in Kent. Its name derives from the local Brythonic language, meaning "great headland" (*Rogulbion).

== History ==
The first Roman military installation in the area was a small fort built directly after the invasion of Britain in the reign of Claudius, protected by earthworks. It was connected to Durovernum (Canterbury) by a road. The fort, strategically located at the entrance of the Wantsum Channel, possibly housed a signal tower, perhaps a lighthouse, and continued in operation at least until the late 60s, since coins dating to the reign of Nero were found on site. This structure lay within the bounds of the later, larger stone fort, which was built in the early 3rd century, probably in c. 210, since the sole stone inscription found at the fort (in 1960) mentions the then governor of Britain, Aulus Triarius Rufinus. This construction occurred at a time when cities and strategic sites all over Western Europe were fortified in response to the greater threat posed by barbarian raids. The archaeological remains display another period of great activity towards the end of the century, the time of the Carausian Revolt, and again in the first half of the 4th century. However, it appears that after 360, the fort was abandoned by the Roman military.

The masonry castrum at Reculver is unusually early for its location and type, but it can be compared in both age and design with the forts at Brancaster and Caister-on-Sea, both in Norfolk, and it may be that "the east coast was in need of protection before the south coast, which was patrolled by the Roman navy, the Classis Britannica." The design of the fort at Reculver can also be compared with those along Hadrian's Wall, in northern England. The Notitia Dignitatum (whose western records date from the early 5th century but probably describe the situation at a slightly earlier date), reports the garrison at Reculver as the Cohors I Baetasiorum, and this is reflected in the discovery there of tiles stamped with the initials "CIB". The Cohors I Baetasiorum were previously stationed at Maryport, in Cumbria, and, since they probably built the fort at Reculver, this may explain the similarity between it and the forts along Hadrian's Wall.

After the arrival of the Anglo-Saxons in Britain, the site continued to be inhabited, and, now called Raculf, became a residence of the Kings of Kent. In 669, King Ecgberht of Kent founded a monastery on the site of the fort. It clearly was important, since in 690, its abbot, Berhtwald, became Archbishop of Canterbury.

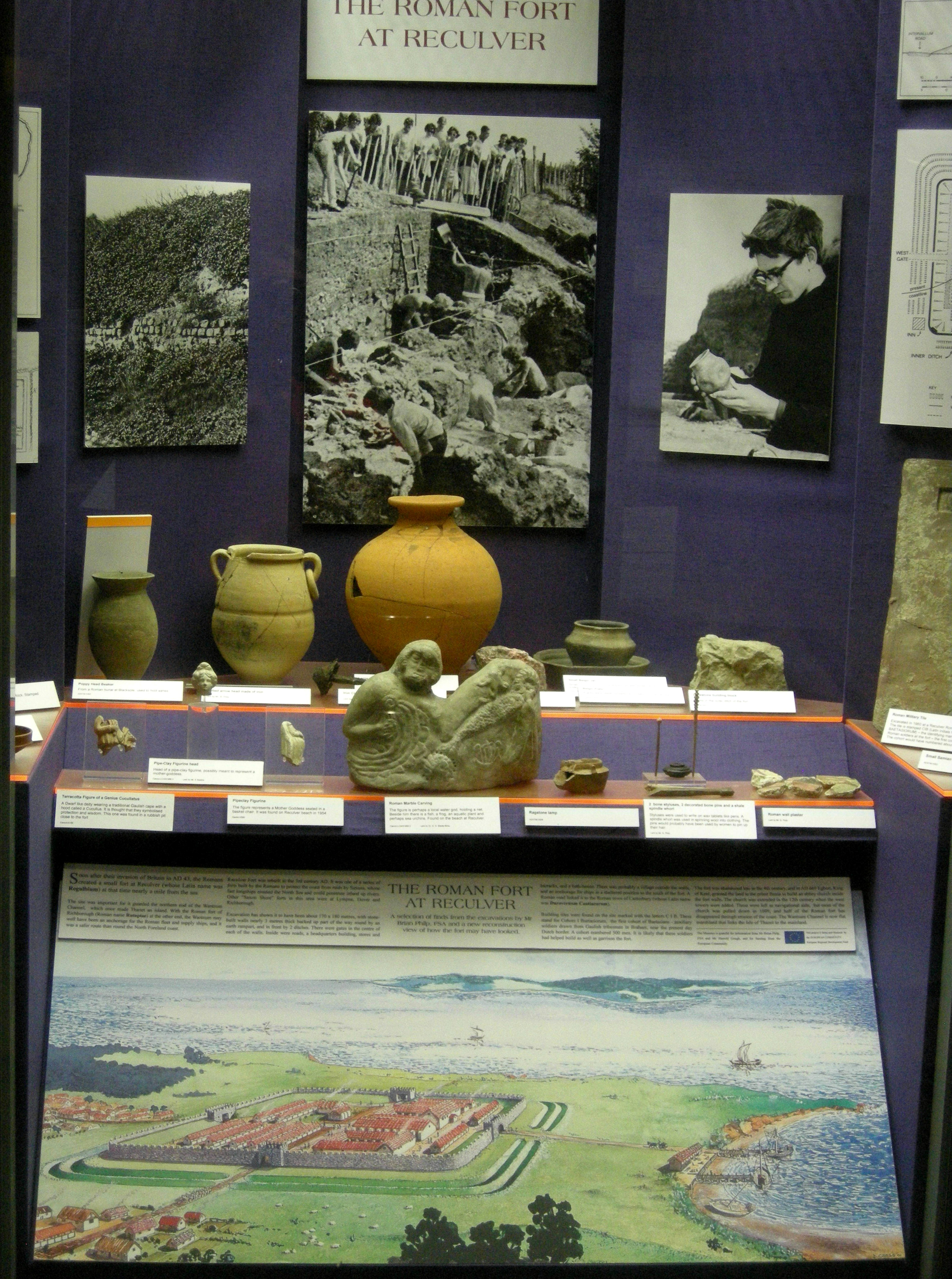
Herne Bay Museum display centred on the Roman fort at Reculver

== Location and construction ==
The fort stood on the mainland side of the northern entrance to the mile-wide Wantsum Channel, which separated the Isle of Thanet from the mainland. The Channel was a favoured passage for shipping, and the fort was built to both control it and act as a navigational marker. The construction was typical of a Saxon Shore fort, square-shaped with rounded corners. The single rampart was 10 feet (3.0 m) thick at the base tapering to 8 feet (2.4 m) at the top, with a height of probably 20 feet (6.1 m). It was additionally strengthened by an earthen rampart on the interior, and surrounded by two external ditches. The fort covered an area of 3.06 ha, but almost half of that has been lost to the sea due to erosion.

== Sources ==
- Fields, N. (2006), Rome's Saxon Shore - Coastal Defences of Roman Britain AD 250-500 (Fortress 56), Osprey Publishing, ISBN 978-1-84603-094-9
- Harris, S. (2001), Richborough and Reculver, London: English Heritage, ISBN 978-1-85074-765-9
- Johnston, D.E.; et al. (1977), "The Saxon Shore" (PDF), CBA Research Report (18)
- Philp, B. (1969), "The Roman Fort at Reculver Excavations 1968 – Interim Report.", Kent Archaeological Review (15)
- Philp, B. (2005), Report on the Excavations of Roman Reculver, Kent Archaeological Rescue Unit, ISBN 0-947831-24-X
