= Rufinus (Roman governor) =

... Rufinus is the fragment of the name of a governor of Britannia Superior, a province of Roman Britain probably some time during the early third century AD. He may have been the same man as Aulus Triarius Rufinus who was suffect consul around 210, although Quintus Aradius Rufinus who was consul ten or fifteen years later is another possibility.

The name Rufinus is recorded only on an inscription found at the ancient Roman fort of Regulbium in Kent, in a context with pottery that could be loosely dated to c. 220 AD. This same name is also identified at the Roman Fort at Aballava in reference to the Aurelian Moors: "To Jupiter, Best and Greatest, and to the Divinities of the two Emperors and the Genius of the unit of Aurelian Moors, Valerian's and Gallienus' Own, Flavius Vibianus, tribune of the cohort and commander of the unit mentioned above, (set this up) under the direction of Julius Rufinus, princeps." Likely referring to the Governor of the Province.

Salway 2022 notes a recent milestone from Galatia that records a C. Aradius Rufinus dated to a.d. 236, who can likely be identified with the consular governor of Britannia Superior.
