= Greenhill =

Greenhill may refer to:

== People ==
- Greenhill (surname)

== Places ==
In the UK

- Greenhill, Camden, London, England
- Greenhill, County Antrim, a townland in County Antrim, Northern Ireland
- Greenhill, County Durham, England
- Greenhill, County Fermanagh, a townland in County Fermanagh, Northern Ireland
- Greenhill, Dorset, England
- Greenhill, a neighbourhood of Coatbridge, Scotland
- Greenhill, Dumfriesshire, Scotland
- Greenhill, Edinburgh, Scotland
- Greenhill, Evesham, Worcestershire, England, main location of the Battle of Evesham in 1265
- Greenhill, Falkirk, Scotland
- Greenhill, Harrow, London, England
  - Greenhill (Harrow ward)
- Greenhill, Herefordshire England
- Greenhill, Kent, England
- Greenhill, Kidderminster, Worcestershire, England
- Greenhill, Lancashire, England
- Greenhill, Leicestershire, England
- Greenhill, Sheffield, England
- Greenhill, Swansea, Wales

Elsewhere

- Greenhill, Nova Scotia, Canada
- Zielonagóra (Greenhill), a village in Greater Poland Voivodeship, Szamotuły County, Obrzycko commune, Poland
- Greenhill, South Australia, a suburb in Australia
  - Greenhill Recreation Park, a protected area in South Australia
- Greenhill Ogham Stones, Republic of Ireland

== Businesses and institutions ==
- Greenhill & Co., a New York-based investment bank
- Greenhill School (Addison, Texas), Addison, Texas, United States
- Ysgol Greenhill School, Pembrokeshire, Wales, United Kingdom

== Titles ==
- Baron Greenhill (of Townhead in the City of Glasgow)
- Baron Greenhill of Harrow
- Greenhill-Russell Baronets

== See also ==
- Green Hill (disambiguation)
- Green Hills (disambiguation)
- Greenhills (disambiguation)
- Greensill, and Greensill Capital a UK-based steel conglomerate
- Grinnell (disambiguation)
