= Green Hill =

Green Hill may refer to:

- Green Hill (Lancashire), a 626 m mountain in Lancashire, England

== Cities, towns, and villages ==
=== United States ===
- Green Hill, Alabama, Alabama, United States
- Green Hill, Indiana, Indiana, United States
- Green Hill, Rhode Island, United States, a village in South Kingstown
- Green Hill, Tennessee, Tennessee, United States
- Green Hill, West Virginia

=== Elsewhere ===
- a rural area near Malmsbury, Australia
- Green Hill, Wiltshire, England
- Zielona Góra (Green Hill in Polish), a town in Lubusz Voivodeship, Poland

== Other ==
- Green Hill House, listed on the National Register of Historic Places
- Green Hill (Hillsborough, North Carolina), plantation in Hillsborough, North Carolina
- Green Hill (Virginia Beach, Virginia), listed on the National Register of Historic Places
- Green Hill Zone, a level in the Sonic the Hedgehog video game
- Green Hill Country, a fictional location in J. R. R. Tolkien's Middle-earth
- Green Hill Site, listed on the NRHP in Massachusetts
- Green Hill Cemetery (disambiguation)

== See also ==
- Greenhill (disambiguation)
- Greenhills (disambiguation)
- Green Hills (disambiguation)
