= Greenhill (surname) =

Greenhill is a surname. Notable people with the surname include:

- Alfred George Greenhill (1847–1927), British mathematician
- Basil Greenhill (1920–2003), English diplomat, museum director and historian
- Catherine Greenhill, Australian mathematician
- Craig Greenhill (born 1972), Australian rugby league player
- David Greenhill (born 1985), Scottish footballer
- Denis Greenhill, Baron Greenhill of Harrow (1913–2000), British diplomat
- Elizabeth Greenhill (1615–1679), British mother of 39 children
- Elizabeth Greenhill (bookbinder), (1907–2006), English bookbinder
- Ernest Greenhill, 1st Baron Greenhill (1887–1967), Scottish politician
- Gary Greenhill (born 1985), Scottish footballer
- Sir George Greenhill (1847–1927), English mathematician
- Henry Greenhill (1646–1708), British mariner and politician
- Joe R. Greenhill (1914–2011), American attorney, chief justice of the Texas Supreme Court
- John Greenhill (c. 1644–1676), English portrait painter
- John Russell Greenhill (c. 1730–1813), English clergyman, owner of "Chequers"
- Joseph Greenhill (1704–1788), English clergyman and religious disputer
- Kelly M. Greenhill (born 1970), American political scientist
- Robert F. Greenhill (born 1936), American investment banker
- Sir Robert Greenhill-Russell, 1st Baronet (1763–1836), British Member of Parliament, owner of "Chequers"
- Thomas Greenhill (colonial administrator) (1611–1658), English colonial administrator, pioneer of the British East India Company
- Thomas Greenhill (surgeon) (1669–1740), British surgeon and author
- William Greenhill (1591–1671), English nonconformist clergyman and author
- William Alexander Greenhill (1814–1894), English physician, literary editor and sanitary reformer
