= Eddington, Kent =

Suburb of Herne Bay, Kent, England

Coordinates: 51.362°N 1.127°E

Eddington
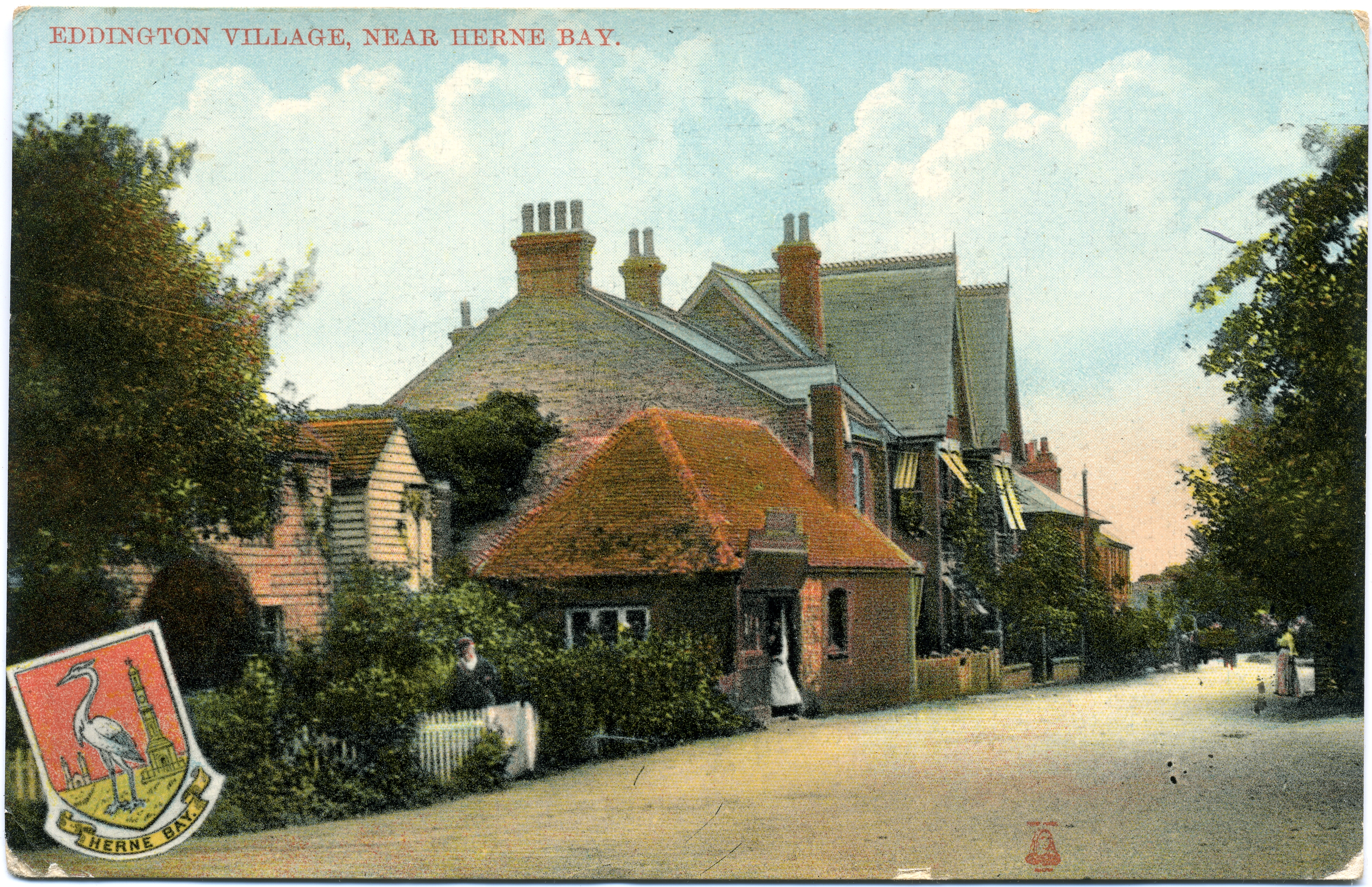
- Eddington village, 1907

- Location within Kent
- Population: 5,211 (2001) (with Greenhill)
- OS grid reference: TR1867
- Civil parish: Herne and Broomfield
- District: City of Canterbury
- Shire county: Kent
- Region: South East
- Country: England
- Sovereign state: United Kingdom
- Post town: HERNE BAY
- Postcode district: CT6
- Dialling code: 01227
- Police: Kent
- Fire: Kent
- Ambulance: South East Coast
- UK Parliament: Canterbury

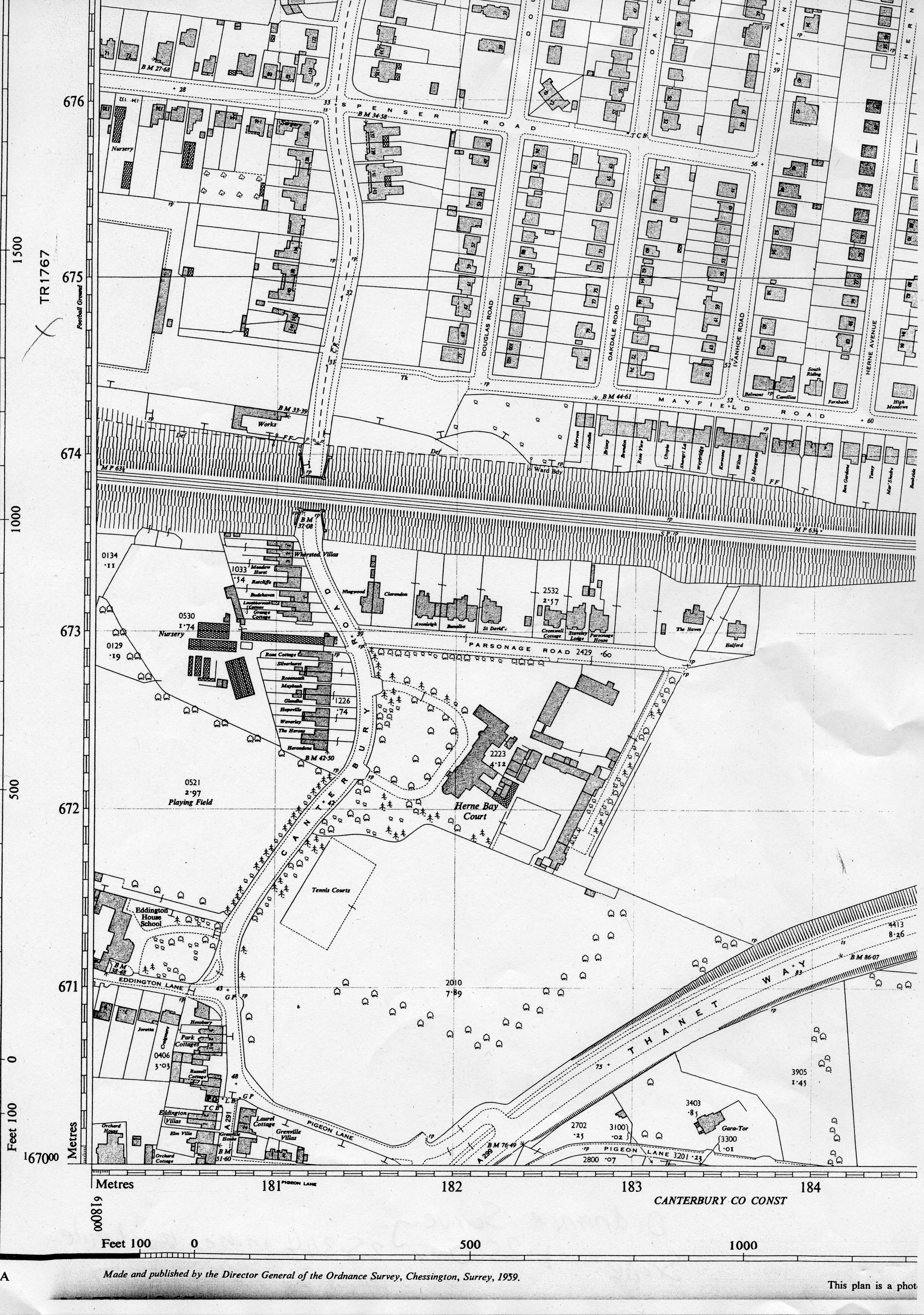
Eddington in 1959

Eddington was a village in Kent, South East England to the south-east of Herne Bay, to the west of Beltinge and to the north of Herne. It is now a suburb of Herne Bay, in Greenhill and Eddington Ward, one of the five wards of Herne Bay. Its main landmark for over 100 years until 2010 was Herne Bay Court, a former school which once possessed one of the largest and best-equipped school engineering workshops in England; it later became a Christian conference centre.

== Geography ==
Eddington was a village and is now a suburb in the south of Herne Bay, on what is now the Canterbury Road or A291. It is in Greenhill and Eddington ward, and forms part of Herne and Broomfield parish.

=== Geology and topography ===
Eddington is approximately 13 metres above sea level, lying above mainly London Clay with some head Brickearth next to Plenty Brook; however to the east this changes to Tertiary deposits of the Thanet, Oldhaven and Woolwich beds. Its northern boundary is the railway line, and its southern edge includes the Thanet Way and Herne Bay cemetery. At its western limit is Eddington Business Park and its eastern sector contains part of Eddington Conservation Area. This conservation area includes a small portion of the north-west of Herne and Broomfield parish, known locally as the Links. Herne Bay Golf Club is in the south of Eddington. Herne Bay Golf Club closed sometime during between 2011 and 2016 and has since been transformed into yet another housing estate. Eddington Business Park contains Herne Bay Delivery Office for the Royal Mail. Herne bay delivery and sorting office closed in 2016 and is now a children's soft play area. In the past, parts of Eddington have been susceptible to flooding from Plenty Brook and the Council has recommended the construction of upstream storage lagoons near Herne Bay Golf Course besides other measures.

=== Local government ===
As of January 2010 the local councillors for Greenhill and Eddington Ward were Roger Matthews and Margaret Flaherty, both representing the Liberal Democrats. Herne Bay councillor Roger Matthews was charged in March 2009 alongside Herne Bay Golf Club owner Julian Brealy in respect of corruption. Matthews represented Greenhill and Eddington ward on Canterbury City Council, and was suspended from the local Liberal Democrats group. The councillor denied the charge and was later cleared, but the businessman was convicted. Previously in 2008, Greenhill and Eddington ward representative Margaret Flaherty was taking on local council work herself, clearing shrubbery from road signs at Eddington. At times the council has chosen to remove travelling families from this area. Kent Enterprise House at Eddington hosts the annual parish meetings.

== History ==
Much of the history of the layout and buildings of Eddington is described in the Eddington Conservation Appraisal of 2009.

=== Archaeology ===
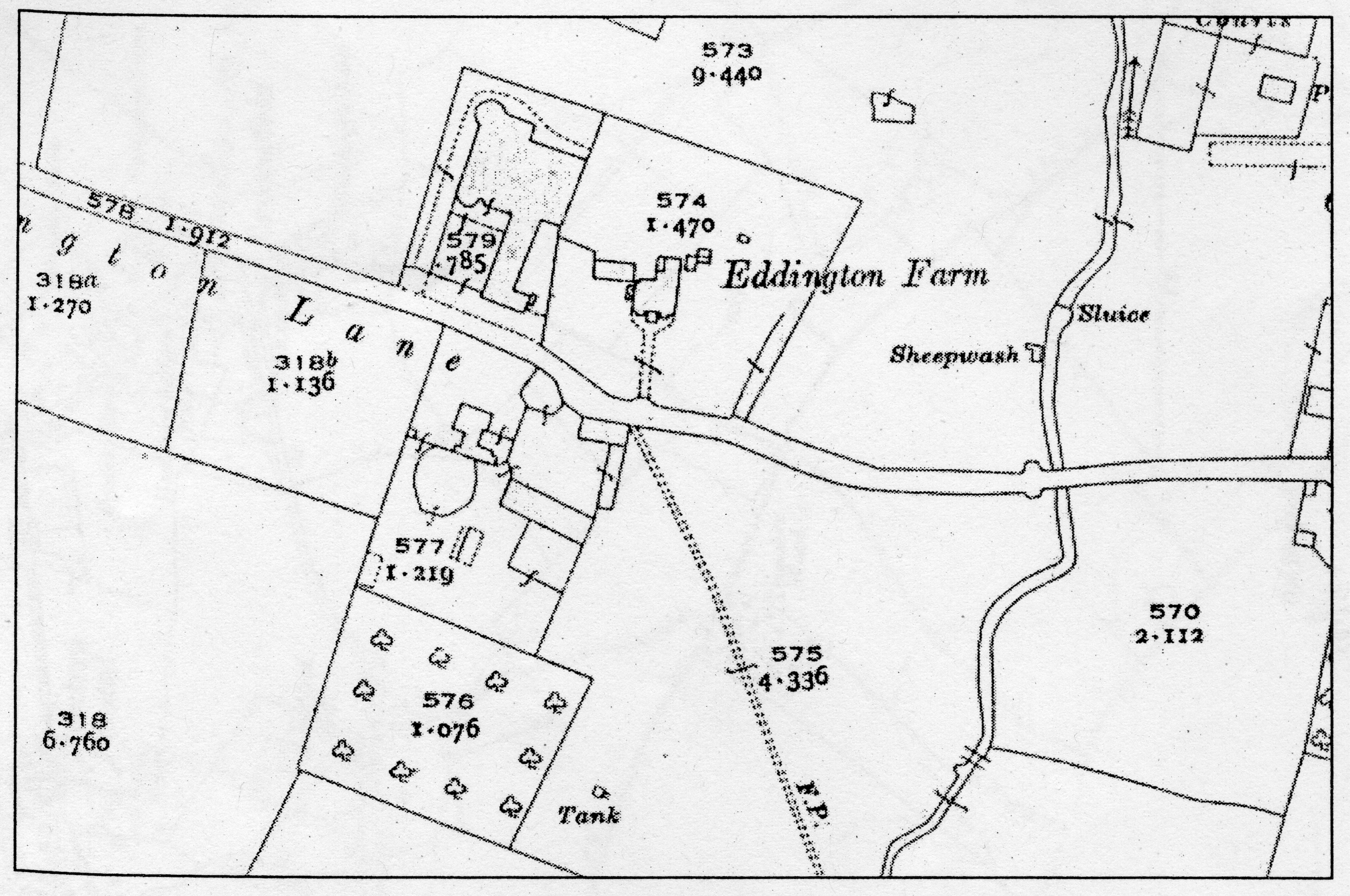
Eddington Farm in 1932

Between August and September 1998, an archaeological dig by Houliston found evidence of early occupation in the vicinity of Eddington Farm, and a follow-up investigation by Crispin Jarman and Grant Shand found signs of occupation, farming and burial which had occurred from the later Neolithic period, around 3,500 BCE. The evidence for this was a polished stone axe found near the present Thanet Way. A late Bronze Age enclosure was found near a possibly earlier monument with a ring ditch. It is thought that late Bronze Age tree-clearance and consequent soil erosion may explain a subsequent period of abandonment of this farmland. The Romans and Romano-British then laid out a field system and made cremation burials. There is some evidence of local habitation occurring at the end of the Roman occupation. At the north of the Eddington Farm site in the early- or mid-Saxon period, a farmstead was built.

In October 2003 Crispin Jarman investigated apparent concentrations of early to middle Iron Age activity and medieval activity on land adjacent to the old Thanet Way at Underdown Lane. It is thought that the 4–8 Iron Age roundhouses there are part of a larger settlement, along with a possible cremation burial. A possible northern edge of a medieval farmstead was discovered in the south-west corner of the site, along with pottery from the 13th and 14th centuries.

In April 2007 there were archaeological investigations at Talmead House, Mill Lane, and on land to the west of Mill Lane, Eddington. Features including Roman cremation burials were found, including one adjacent to Talmead Pond.

=== Later history ===
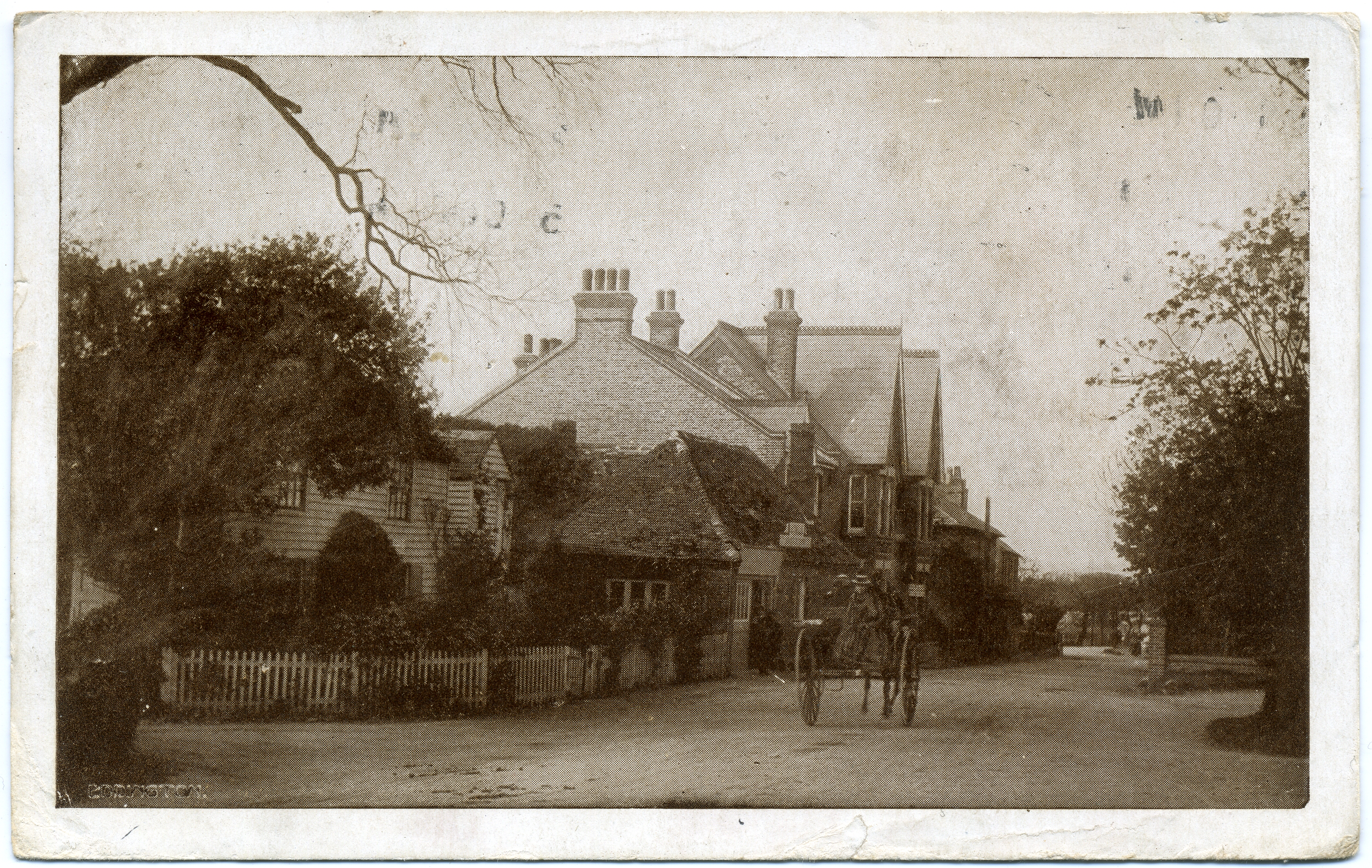
Eddington, 1914, just north of Priory House on the east side of Canterbury Road: these buildings still exist

==== 15th century to present: summary ====
Eddington, of which ton means a small settlement or farmstead, is first mentioned in 1466 CE. Between the 16th and 19th centuries it was a hamlet set among fields, with farms, tracks and roads. By 1800 it had become a junction between roads to Sea Street (Upper Bay), Underdown, Greenhill, Blacksole, Beltinge Fostal and Herne Bay. There was an old track which turned sharply, linking Parsonage Farm and Badcock Farm, and this track was upgraded to a turnpike road joining Herne Bay and Canterbury in 1814. In 1860 the Faversham-Ramsgate railway (now Chatham Main Line) cut through the roads to Sea Street, Beltinge and Blacksole, but the Canterbury Road had its own bridge under the railway embankment, and at that time it was realigned to fit. Terraced housing was built on Canterbury Road in the 1890s, and Parsonage and Badcock farmsteads were demolished around 1900. Parsonage Road was developed by 1930, but there was no more development until the 1950s at Eddington Lane. Between the 1950s and the 21st century, most of the remaining open land was built up, except for The Links. For example, in the 1990s Nurserylands housing estate was built to the north of Eddington Lane and facing onto Plenty Brook; however Vincent Nurseries to the south of the development retains a rural aspect. One of the more recent developments in 2001 was St Augustine's Court housing estate on the junction of Canterbury Road and the Old Thanet Way (A2990).

==== 19th century: spotlight ====
In 1800 Edward Hasted described the parish, which included Herne, as follows:

A wild and dreary country; there is a great deal of poor land in it, covered with broom, and several wastes or little commons, with cottages interspersed among them. The soil of it is in general a stiff clay, and in some parts mixed with gravel, the water throughout it is very brackish. The southern part of it is mostly coppice woods, a considerable quantity of which belong to the archbishop. and are in his own occupation. There are thirty-seven teams kept in this parish. There are about seventeen acres of hops in it, and not long ago double that number, and these are continually displanting. It also produces much canary-seed, of which it has sometimes had one hundred acres ... Northward from (Herne) is Underwood farm, and opposite to it the parsonagehouse, formerly the residence of the Milles's. These are within the hamlet of Eddinton, in which, further on upon the road, is a new-built house, belonging to Mr. Edward Reynolds.

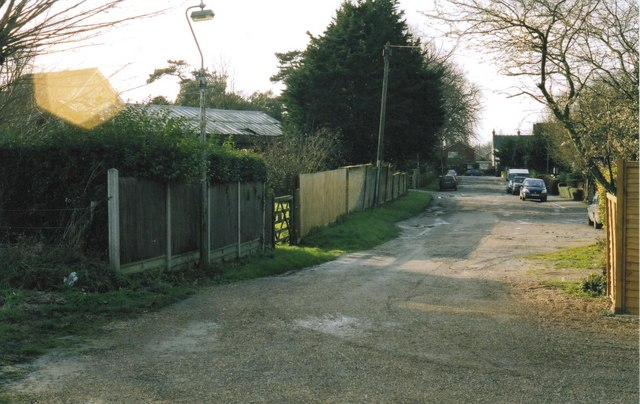
Parsonage Road

Hasted also mentions Underdowne Farm in Eddington, owned in 1800 by the Oxendon family who had rebuilt the farmhouse. Underdowne Farm was once part of the manor of Makinbrooke in the north-west part of the parish of Herne. This manor was originally owned by the See of Canterbury for the benefit of knights who served their country. After Edward III's reign the manor belonged to Adam le Eyre of London, then to Thomas Wolton of Eastbridge hospital in Canterbury. By 1528, Robert atte Sea of Herne was renting the land. It was subsequently inherited by the Crayford family, and then the aforementioned Oxendons.

By 1858 Eddington and Underdown were separate districts of Herne parish. In Eddington, Edward Collard was a farmer, William Evans was the surgeon in Herne Street, Eddington, William Johncock was the blacksmith, and Thomas Taylor was running the Blacksmiths' Arms Inn. By 1891, Eddington was still a hamlet in the parish of Herne. It had a post office, a blacksmith, a builder and a maltster. Residences included Prospect House, The Priory and Eddington House.

=== Landmarks ===
==== Herne Bay Court ====
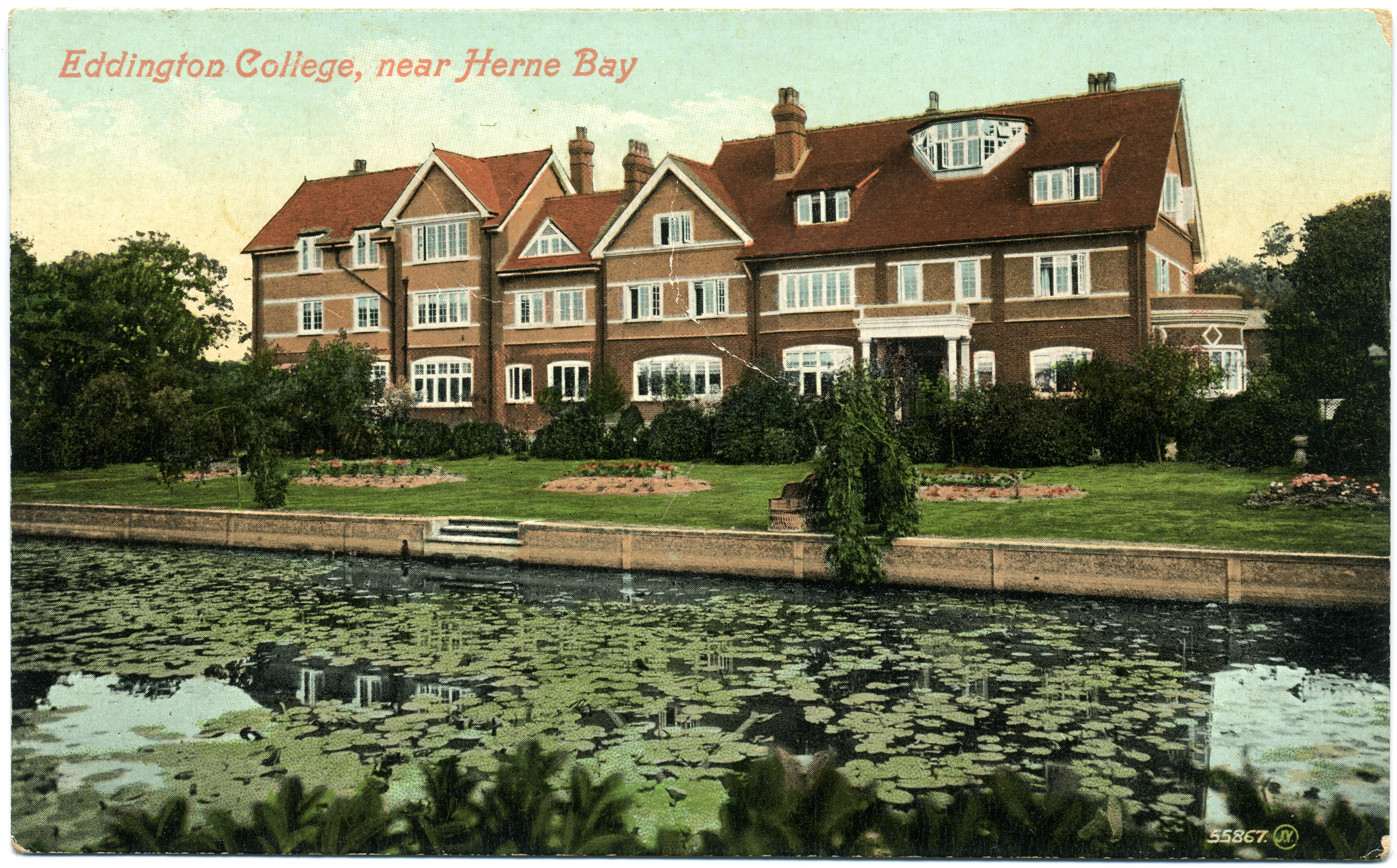
Eddington College before 1914

Herne Bay Court Evangelical Centre, known locally as Herne Bay Court, was a Herne Bay local landmark from around 1900 to around 2008, situated near Talmead. Around 1900, James Thurman MA bought part of Parsonage Farm at Eddington from Joseph Gore who had leased 165 acres between Herne and the sea at the end of the 19th century. Gore kept the 15-acre field which still exists at the end of Parsonage Road, and kept a herd to supply The Creameries in Herne Bay, but sold up in 1914. Meanwhile, on the site of the old farmstead Thurman built New College, known locally as Eddington College, as a school in competition with Herne Bay College which at that time occupied numbers 6–8 St George's Terrace, Herne Bay and was run by Captain Eustace Turner. Both schools were evacuated in World War I and were requisitioned by the military. Thurman retired and after the war Eddington College was taken over by Captain Turner who ran it as Herne Bay College until 1939. The college specialised in engineering, and in the 1930s "the College possessed one of the largest and best-equipped school engineering workshops in England, and was remarkable for its many engineering examination successes." However the building and its engineering equipment were requisitioned for the World War II war effort. After the loss of the engineering equipment, the school could not reopen after the war and the building was sold. It reopened in 1949 as Herne Bay Court: a Christian conference centre. By 2006 it had closed and was standing empty for several years, with the council discussing development plans. Between 2007 and 2010 there was a local movement to save or reopen Herne Bay Court. This building is locally listed in respect of its use as army headquarters in World War II. The trees at Herne Bay court are subject to a tree preservation order.

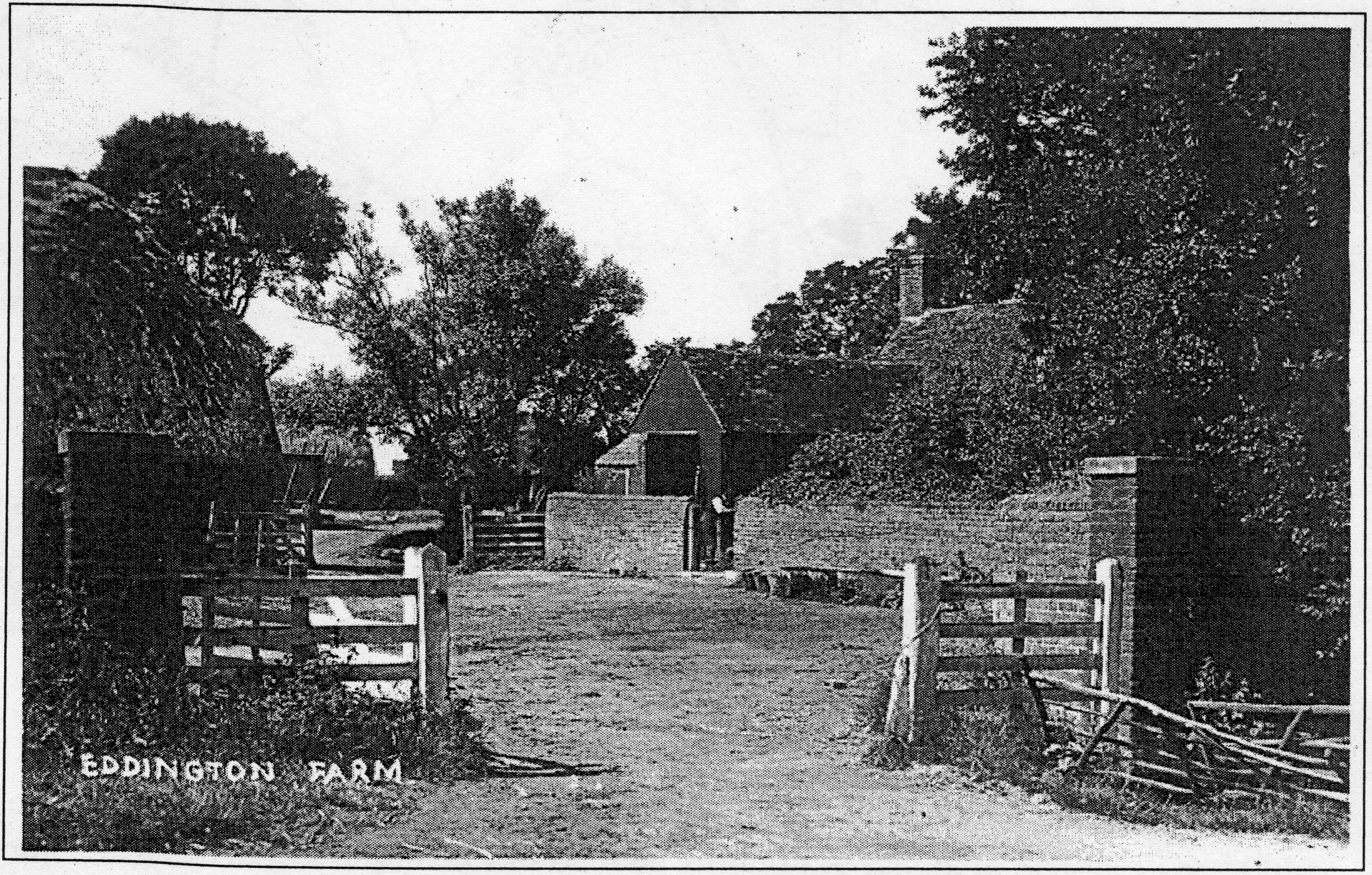
Eddington Farm, now demolished

==== Eddington Farm (demolished) ====
Eddington Farm was on Eddington Lane and next to Plenty Brook. It originally occupied the site of the present Herne Bay sorting office and business park. It was recorded as a 40−acre farm in 1661, stretching as far as Parsonage Farm, along what is now Canterbury Road and Mill Lane. Past owners and tenants included Richard Constant, Jarvis Dadd, John and Mary Sole and Richard Reynolds. By 1841 it was an arable and pasture farm owned by Edward Collard.

==== Pear Tree House (now The Priory) ====
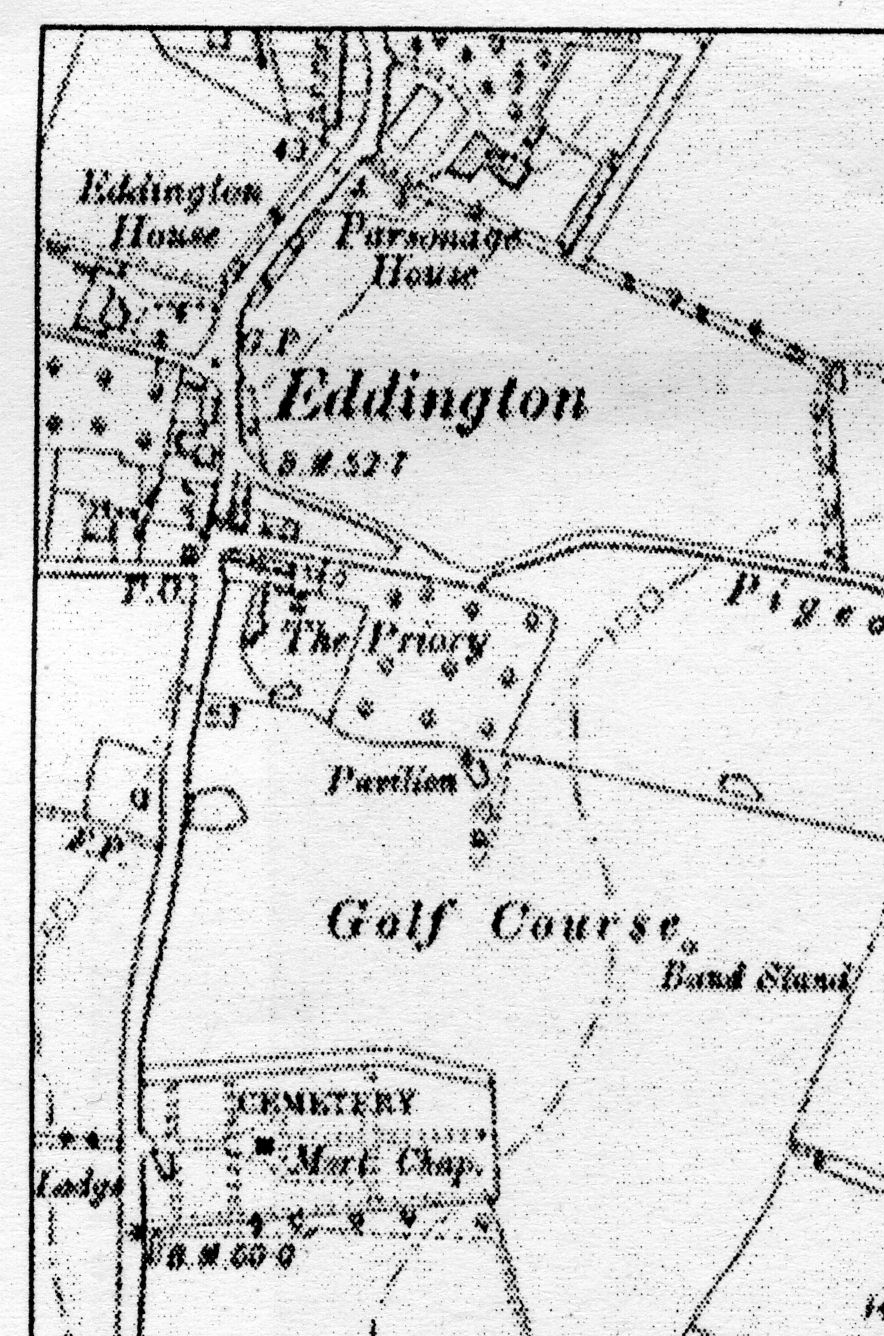
Location of The Priory and Eddington House, 1908

This was at Pigeon Lane, later named Priory Lane. This road joined with Canterbury Road and Underdown Lane, and at the junction there was a hamlet including a smithy, letterbox and guidepost. A ladies' seminary occupied Pear Tree House from the 1830s to 1880s, run by Mrs Sladden and then by sisters Jane and Mary Baskerville. During this period the building was called Pear Tree House until around 1887 when the school closed and it was occupied by Charles Lethbridge and was renamed The Priory. It was a care home for some years, then became a residence. As of 2011 it is a bed and breakfast establishment.

==== Eddington House (demolished) ====
This Georgian house of around 1790 was built as a country residence in spacious grounds on the site now occupied by the Beaumanor housing estate, on the corner between Canterbury Road and Eddington Lane. In the early 20th century it became the preparatory school for Herne Bay College, being renamed Eddington College. It continued as a prep school, changing its name to Bramdean in 1957 and then Beaumanor in the 1960s. It was demolished in 1968 by developers, and the subsequent housing estate was given the name of Beaumanor.

==== Listed buildings ====
All the nationally listed buildings in this area are Grade II or II*. Some of these are listed as groups:

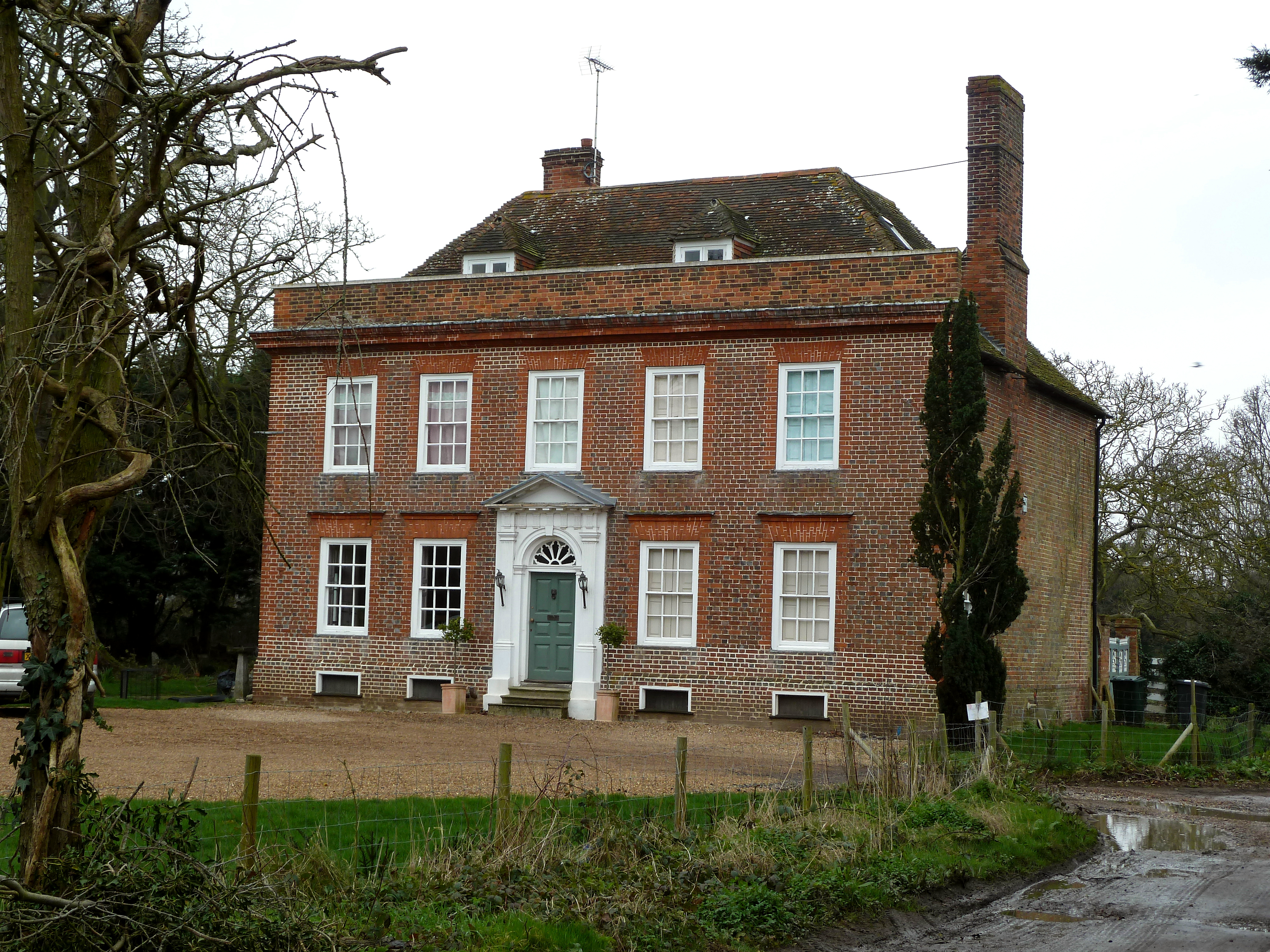
Underdown House

Underdown House group
Underdown House is in Underdown Lane and the associated group includes The Cottage, the Tithe Barn to the south-west and the Old Coach House. The L-shaped Underdown House has a 17th-century west wing and an 18th-century frontage; it has original casement windows with small leaded panes at the back on the west side and at the west end of the southern frontage. Unfortunately the originally rural setting of the house has been compromised by recent contiguous housing estates, St Augustine's Court and Wye Green. The Cottage is mid-19th-century with a hipped slate roof and original cambered sash windows. The Old Coach House is late-17th- to early-18th-century, and is weatherboarded with a tie-beam roof. The Tithe Barn dates from around 1500, and is weatherboarded over a red brick base, with a thatched roof which was once tiled. On the east side the roof has a projecting thatched hip which contains a few original tiles.

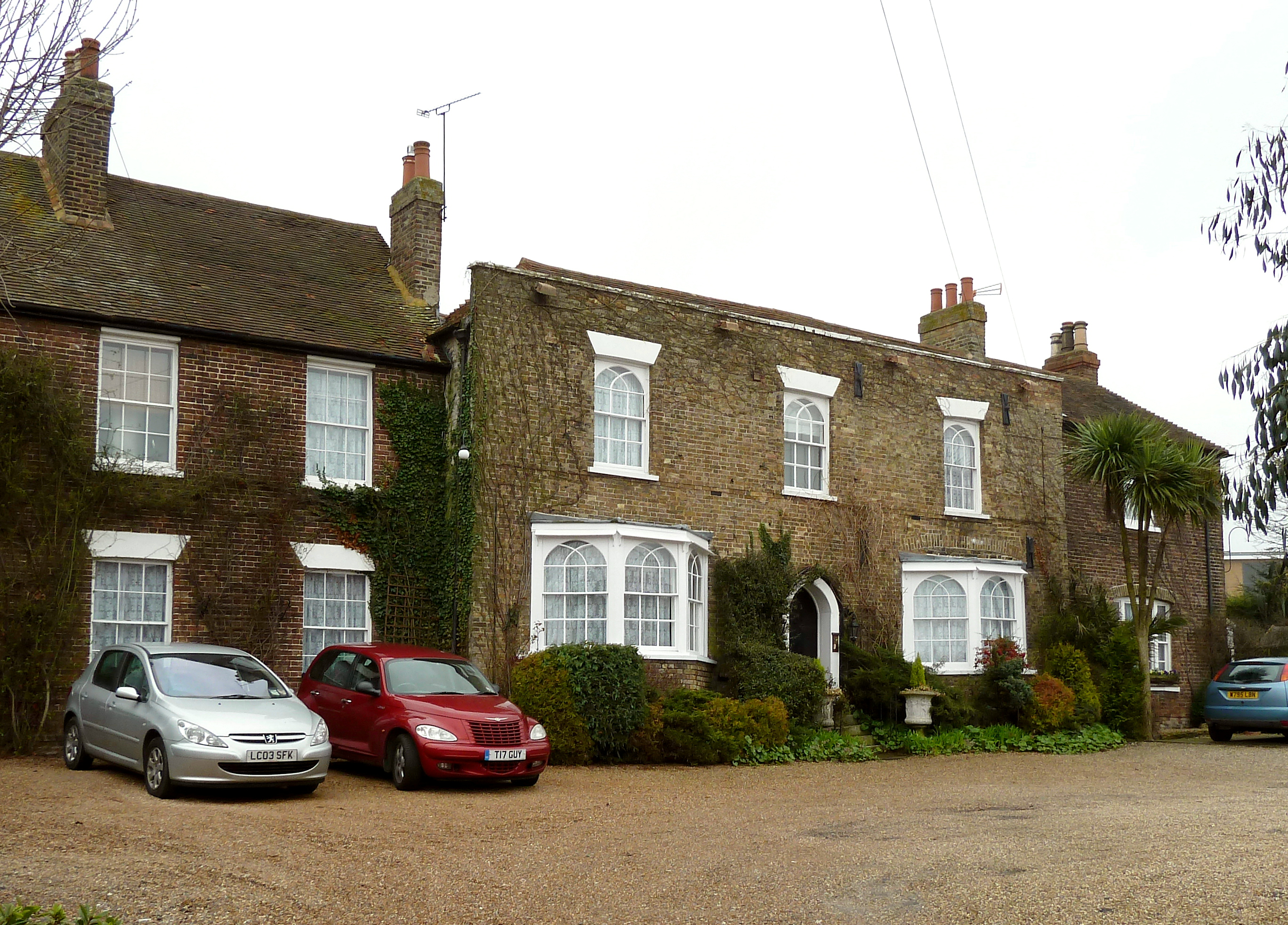
The Priory

Priory (The) group
The Priory is at 203 Canterbury Road. The group includes numbers 1 and 2 Laurel Cottages (numbers 195 and 197 Canterbury Road), and Little Cottage. The Priory is an early-19th-century brown-brick house in Gothic Revival style, including a pointed doorway with moulded architrave. Laurel Cottages date from the 18th century and they have since been pebbledashed, but contain original sash windows. Little Cottage is timber-framed and was re-faced with stucco in the 18th century; it has a tiled roof and original sash windows.

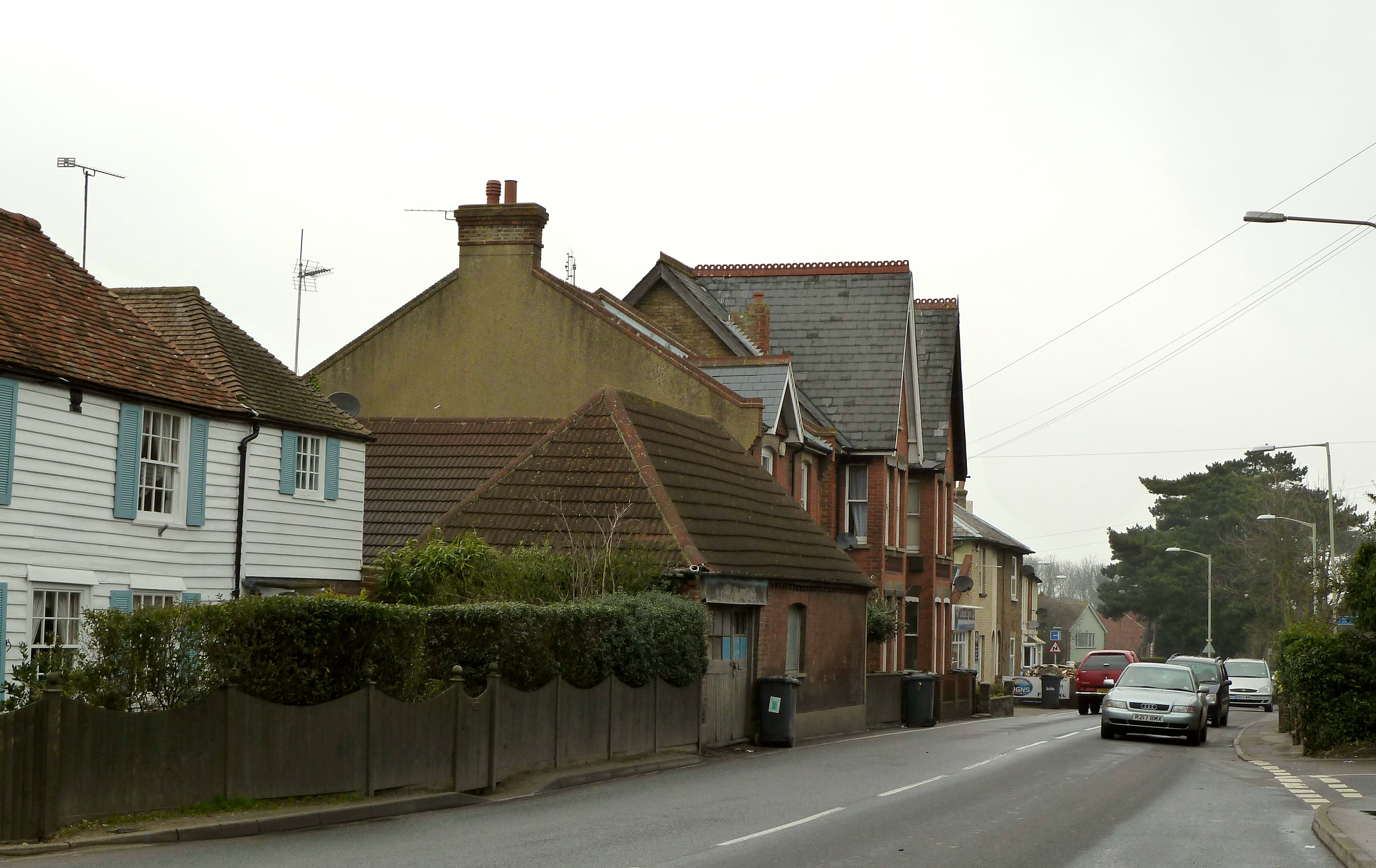
Forge Cottage, 2011

Forge Cottage (The) and sewer vent column
The Forge Cottage is at 250 Canterbury Road. It is an 18th-century, weatherboarded and timber-framed building with a half-hipped, tiled roof. The doorcase is 18th-century, but the 6-panelled door has been moved to another location on the building. Also on Canterbury Road but not grouped with The Forge Cottage is a listed, cast iron sewer vent column with Corinthian capital, dated 1870 and made by W. Macfarlane and Co. in Glasgow.

Among locally listed World War II monuments are the Warden's Post at Eddington House Junior School, Canterbury Road, and the Army occupation of Avonleigh, Parsonage Road. Also relating to World War II is the pillbox near the former crossroads of the Thanet Way and Canterbury Road. Dating from the 19th century or earlier is the Maltings at Eddington Farm.

==== Cemetery ====
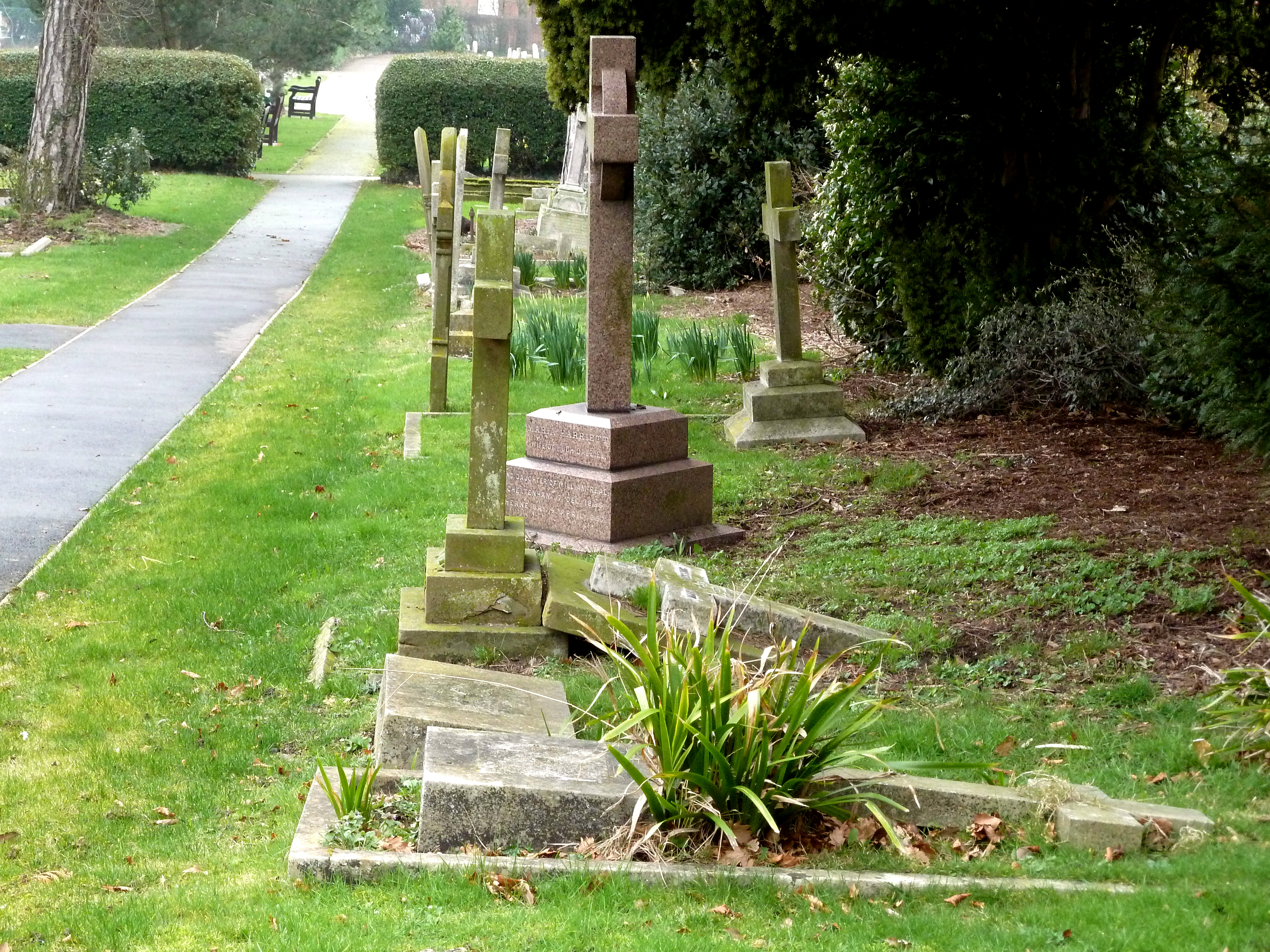
Section J of Herne Bay Cemetery where Edmund Reid lies

Herne Bay cemetery lies at the southern end of Eddington and is controlled by Canterbury City Council. The earliest burials date from 1871. In 1880 interments were officially ended at Herne church and other local graveyards. Edmund Reid, the head of CID who investigated the Whitechapel murders in 1888, is buried in plot J62. Partly in two war grave plots and partly scattered there are 58 identified and two unknown service war graves from World Wars I and II.

The cemetery contains an elaborate monument to Lydia Cecilia Hill, known as Cissie Hill, a cabaret dancer and close friend of Ibrahim, Sultan of Johor who funded the building of Mayfair Court and the associated servants' quarters in Grand Drive, Herne Bay for her. In 1938 there were rumours of an engagement between the "glamour girl" Sissy and the 64-year-old divorcee sultan, whom she had met in Ceylon in 1934, but the sultan promptly denied this. Sissy was killed in a daylight bombing raid aged 27 while shopping in Canterbury on 11 October 1940, and was identified by her jewellery, said to be a gift from the sultan.

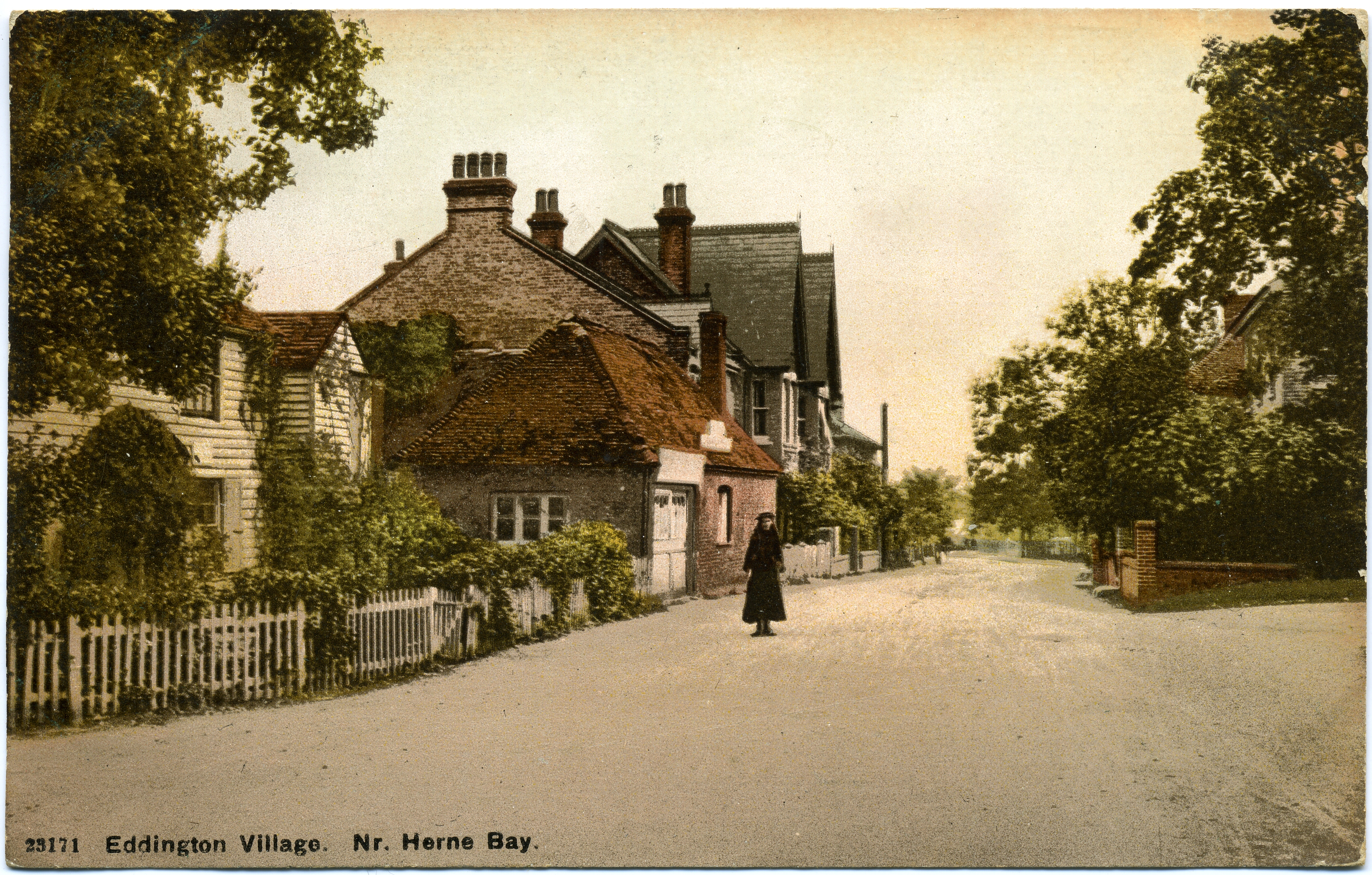
Looking north from the Canterbury Road and Underdown Lane junction, 1908. The weatherboarded building in the foreground is the 18th-century Forge Cottage, and the brick building with large door and chimney may have been the forge. The tall building in the centre is Eddington Villas, built 1896. Beyond the curve of the road ahead on the left would have been the spacious grounds of Eddington House, now the Beaumanor housing estate. Opposite Eddington house, on the right of the road in the distance would have been the grounds of New College (now Herne Bay Court) which was built on the Parsonage farmstead site around 1900. The same scene, photographed in 2011, can be seen in the image above right.

== Bibliography ==
- Fishpool, J. and Turner, P., Schools and Colleges in the Herne Bay Area: Herne Bay Past series no.4 (Herne Bay Historical Records Society, 2010) ISBN 978-1-904661-14-6
- Fishpool, J, A Town at War: Herne Bay in the Second World War: Herne Bay Past Series (Herne Bay Historical Records Society, 3 December 2010) ISBN 1-904661-15-7
