= Greenhills =

Greenhills may refer to:

- Greenhills, North Ayrshire, a village in Ayrshire
- Greenhills, Dublin, a suburb of the city of Dublin, Ireland
- Greenhills, Ohio, a village in the county of Hamilton, Ohio, United States
- Greenhills Beach, a southern suburb of Sydney
- Greenhills School, a school in the city of Ann Arbor, Michigan, United States
- Greenhills Adventure Park, an attraction in Victor Harbor, South Australia
- Greenhills, East Kilbride, a district within the town of East Kilbride, Scotland
- Wack Wack-Greenhills East, Mandaluyong, a barangay of Mandaluyong, Metro Manila, Philippines
  - La Salle Green Hills, in barangay Wack Wack-Greenhills East
- Greenhills, San Juan, a barangay of San Juan, Metro Manila, Philippines
  - Greenhills Shopping Center, in barangay Greenhills
- Greenhills, Western Australia, in the Shire of York, Australia
- Stockland Greenhills, shopping centre in East Maitland, Australia

== See also ==
- Green Hills (disambiguation)
- Greenhill (disambiguation)
- Green Hill (disambiguation)
