= Grinnell =

Grinnell may refer to:

== Places ==
=== United States ===
- Grinnell, Iowa, a city
  - Grinnell College, a liberal arts college in the city
- Grinnell, Kansas, a city
- Grinnell Glacier, a glacier in Montana
- Grinnell Lake, a lake in Montana
- Mount Grinnell, a peak in Montana

=== Canada ===
- Grinnell Land, a section of Ellesmere Island in Nunavut
- Grinnell Peninsula, a peninsula on Devon Island in Nunavut
- Cape Grinnell, a cape on Devon Island in Nunavut at Griffin Inlet

== Other uses ==
- Grinnell (surname)
- Grinnell Mutual, an Iowa, US-based reinsurance company
- Grinnell, Minturn & Co, a 19th-century American shipping company
- Grinnell (automobile), an electric car made in Detroit, Michigan between 1910 and 1913.
- Grinnell fish, otherwise known as a Bowfin
- Grinnell Mechanical Products and SimplexGrinnell, subsidiaries of Tyco International

== See also ==
- Greenhill (disambiguation)
