= Lydia Cecilia Hill =

British dancer

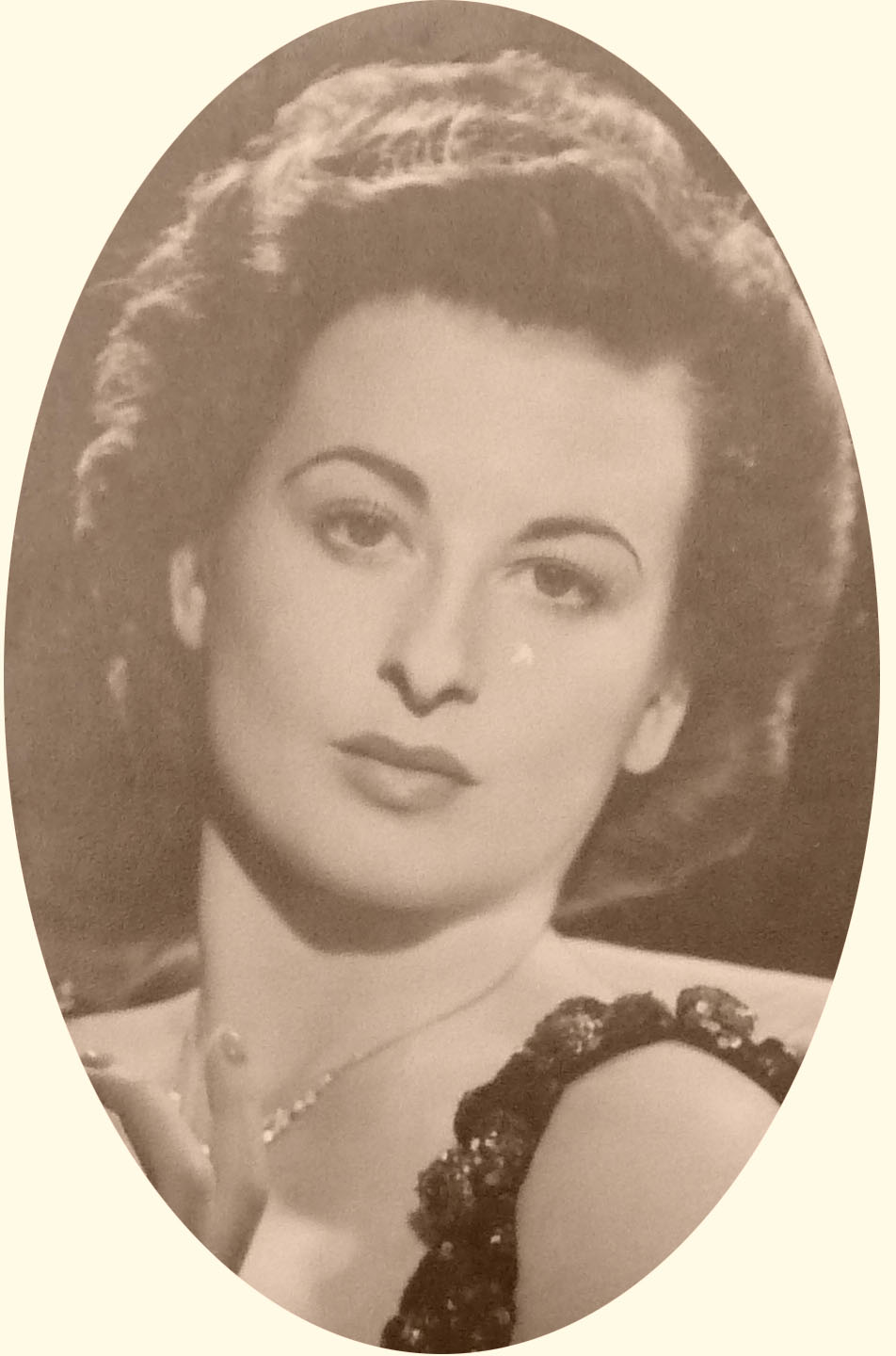
- Lydia Cecilia Hill, c. 1938
- Born: 20 July 1913; Canterbury, England
- Died: 11 October 1940 (aged 27); Canterbury, England
- Occupation: Dancer

Lydia Cecilia Hill (20 July 1913 – 11 October 1940), known as Cissie Hill or Cecily Hill, was an English cabaret dancer notable for being a favourite of Ibrahim, Sultan of Johor and for being briefly engaged to him. A new Art Deco house, Mayfair Court, was funded for her in Herne Bay, Kent, by the Sultan. She was killed during World War II in her native Canterbury at the age of 27 in a German airstrike. There is an elaborate, marble monument on her grave in Herne Bay cemetery, Eddington, paid for by the Sultan.

== Ancestry and early life ==
=== Grandparents and parents ===
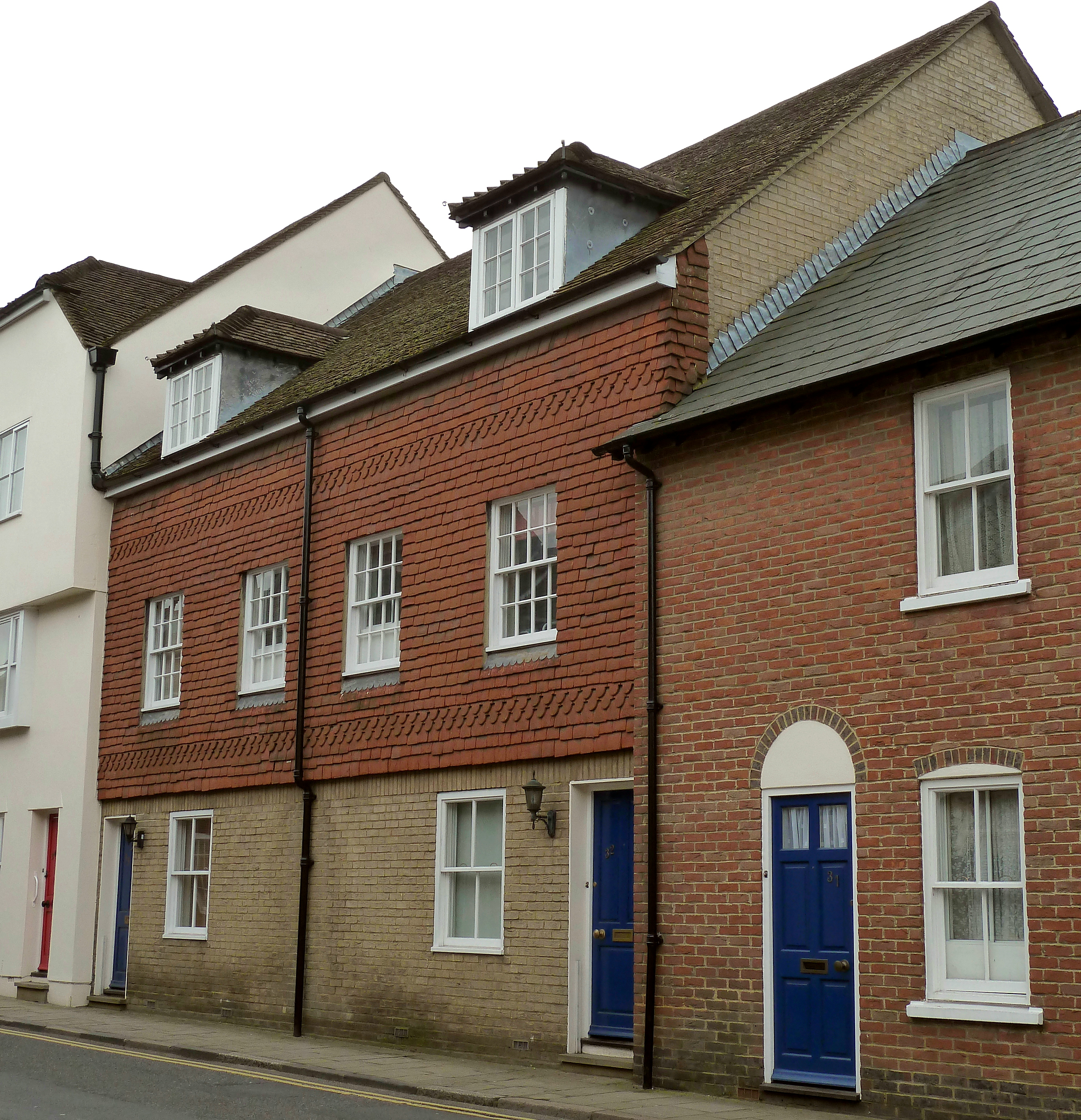
32 Radigund St: her grandparents' home

Hill's paternal grandfather was Joseph Hill, a 'gentleman', possibly of Portsea, Portsmouth, Hampshire. Her maternal grandfather was George Henry Benge, a dairyman born around 1862 in Hastings, Sussex, and retired by 1910. Her maternal grandmother was Cecilia C. Benge born around 1866 in Aston Clinton; Hill's grandparents married in the second quarter of 1886 in Blean. In 1901 the Benge grandparents were living at 32 Radigund Street (now St Radigund Street) in Canterbury Northgate. Living with them were their four sons, their daughter Florence Cecilia born in Canterbury in the first quarter of 1889, and George's married sister. Hill's mother was Florence Cecilia Hill nee Benge, married at the age of 21 on 20 December 1910 at St Gregory's Church, Canterbury. Hill's father was George Hill, R.N., born 11 December 1882 in Portsea: a leading seaman in 1910; a petty officer in 1913; made lieutenant commander in 1915; retired in 1932. He was called up from the Retired List in 1935 and served until 1946. In 1911 Florence was twenty-two and living at 2 Kitchener Terrace, Sturry Road, Canterbury; her husband was absent, presumably on tour. Hill had an elder sister Etta Florence V. Hill, born 13 January 1912.

=== Lydia Cecilia ===
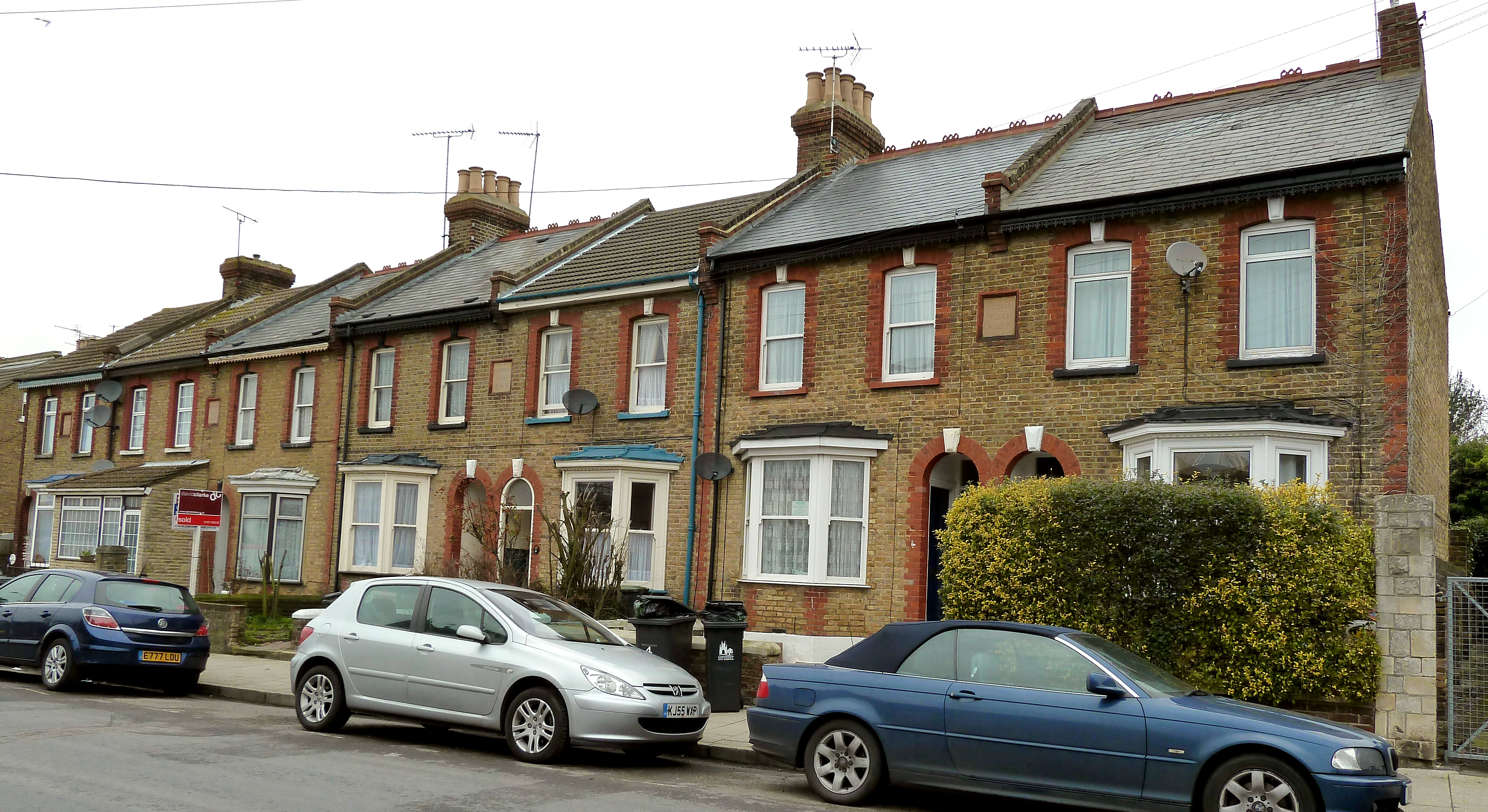
Hill lived here as a child

Hill was born at 2 Kitchener Terrace in Canterbury on 20 July 1913. Her family moved to Herne Bay by 1917 and lived at 4 Kingsbury Villas in Kings Road, Herne Bay, until 1927. She attended Kings Road School which has now been replaced by Herne Bay Junior School. Hill was performing by the age of 10 years. In April 1924, with another child, she performed two humorous songs at a concert at Herne Bay Institute and Sports Club. She was crowned May Queen at the school around 1923–1924. She would have left school in the summer of 1927, 14 years being the national school leaving age at the time. Between 1927 and 1934 the family lived at Hyacinth, Queensbridge Drive, Herne Bay. She trained as a dancer and joined the Grosvenor House cabaret, but has also been described as a minor actress, with platinum hair and blue eyes. She was known as Cecily or Cissie. The Herne Bay Press said:

"She had a talent for dancing, and linked with it was a charming personality, so that for some years she enjoyed much popularity locally, appearing in dancing displays at the old Pier Theatre and elsewhere. Her attractiveness won her success as a dancer in London, where she appeared for several seasons in the West End."

== Cissie and the Sultan ==
=== Courtship ===
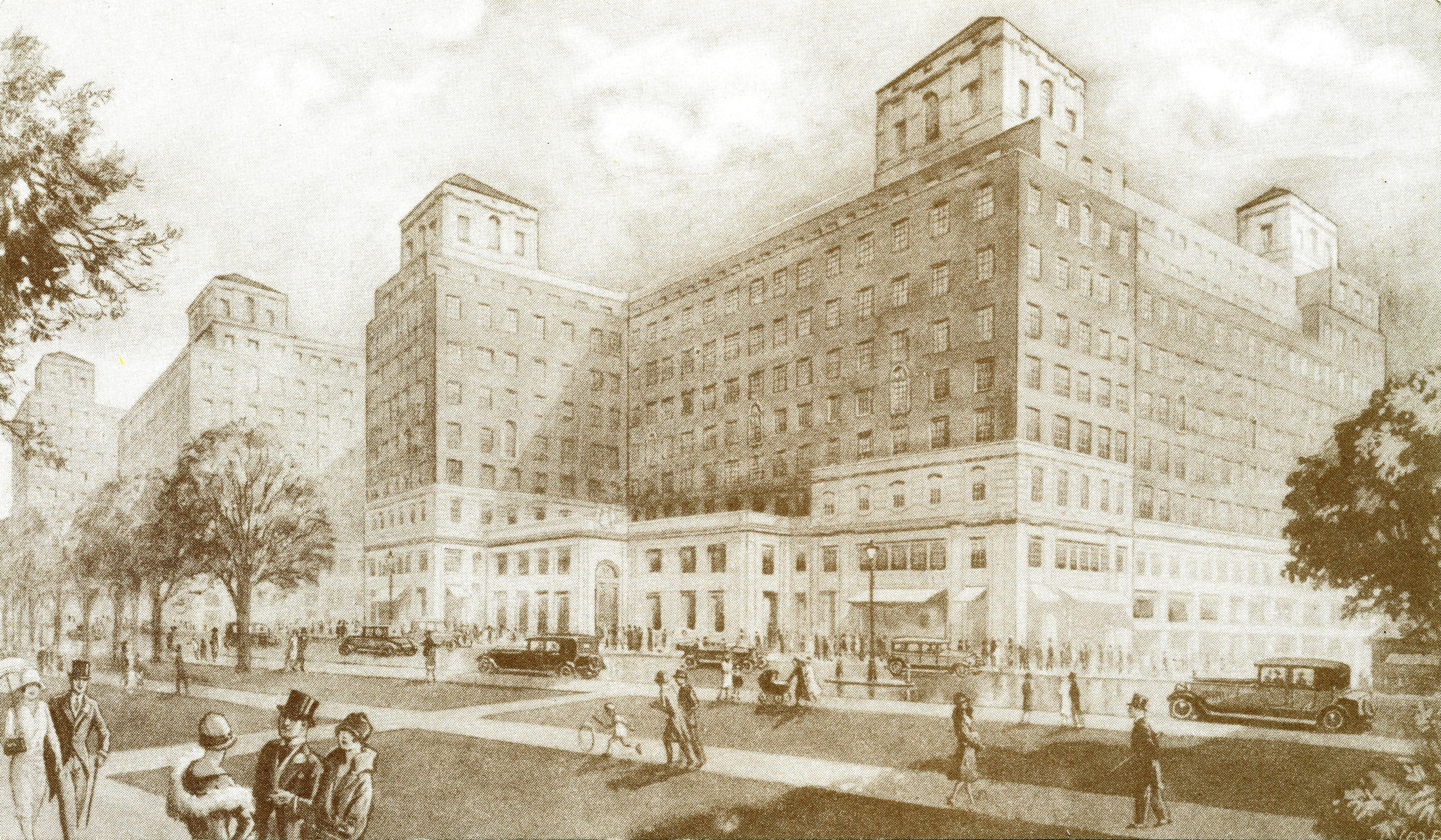
Grosvenor House Hotel where she met the Sultan

On 25 June 1934, it was announced in the Court Circular that Ibrahim, Sultan of Johor had arrived at the Grosvenor House Hotel in Park Lane at the West End of London, during part of his world tour that year. He left for continental Europe, but returned to the Grosvenor House Hotel on 6 September. Hill was appearing as a dancer in the floor show at the same hotel, and first met him there.

She became his favourite, and the Sultan was "fabulously wealthy": in 1935 he gave £500,000 to the British Government for the defence of Singapore, and in 1940 he gave £250,000 towards the cost of World War II. He was also a six-foot-six-inch-tall playboy, whose playgrounds included Sumatra and London, and the relationship with Hill continued. The Sultan funded a new home for Hill in Herne Bay in 1934 or 1935, and by 1935 she was living in the newly built Mayfair Court. She is recorded as living there in 1935; also in 1936 when her father, Lieutenant Hill, retired and came to live with her and her mother. On 20 July 1936, Hill and her mother Florence Cecilia Hill arrived at Southampton from Colombo on the ship Sibajak. According to local historian Harold Gough, she and the Sultan travelled frequently to Johor and Europe in the 1930s.

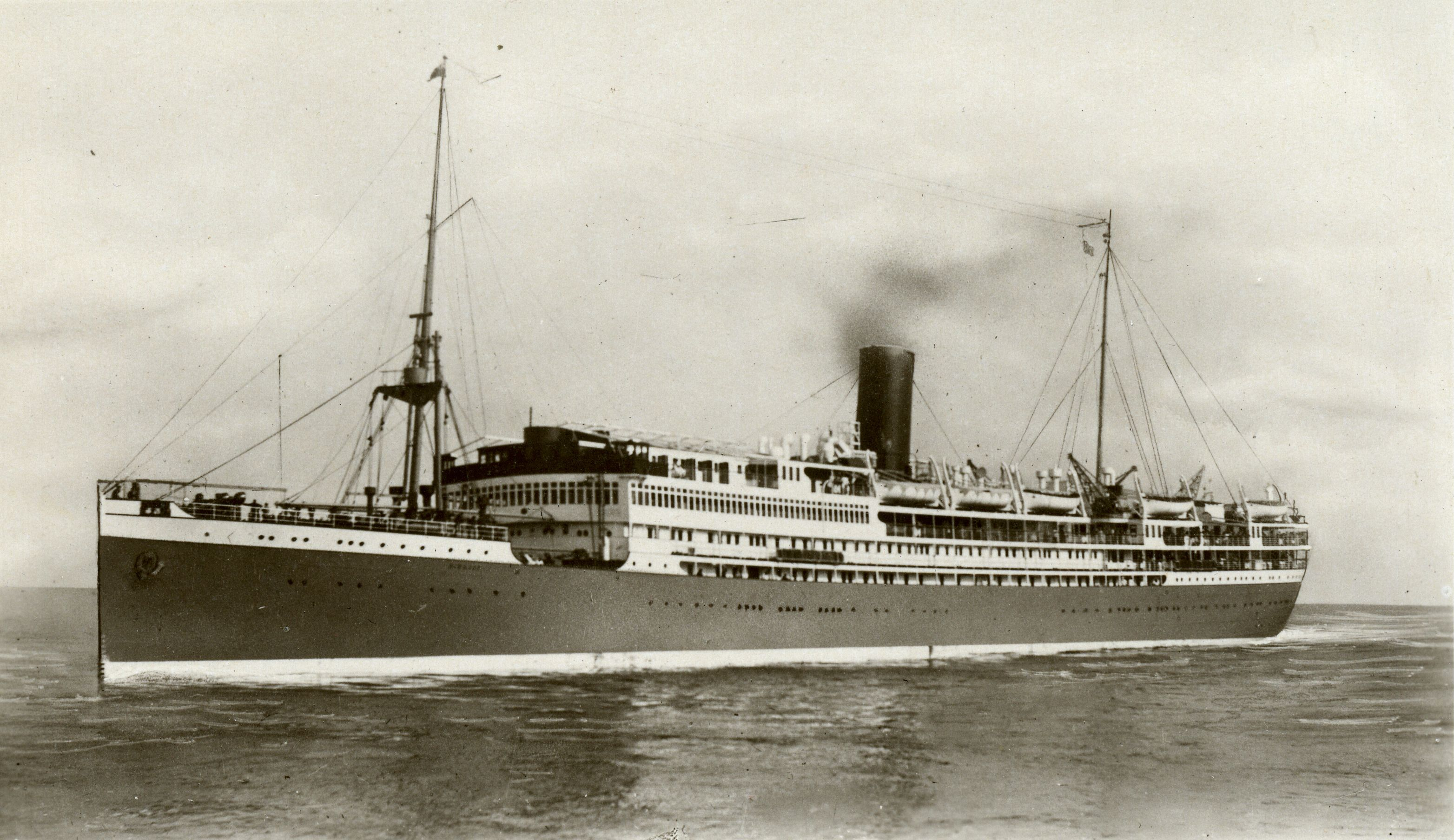
Hill and Her mother travelled on MS Sibajak in 1936

Sometime in 1937, robbers broke into Mayfair Court and stole £5,000-worth of jewellery from Hill's bedroom; this brought the affair with the Sultan into the public eye. Descriptions of the stolen items were published, and it was disclosed that two of them were inscribed, "With all my love, S.I." S.I. was Sultan Ibrahim, but Hill's personal life had been private, and local rumour had invented an Indian maharajah to account for the Hill family's rise in fortune and for the building of Mayfair Court by a resting dancer in 1934. The publicity embarrassed the family, and Hill's mother Florence Hill told a Press reporter that "Lydia" had gone into hiding under medical care due to shock at public attitudes, and that they knew no maharajah. It is not known whether the pressure of this publicity incited the Sultan to announce an engagement in May, 1938.

=== Engagement and denial ===
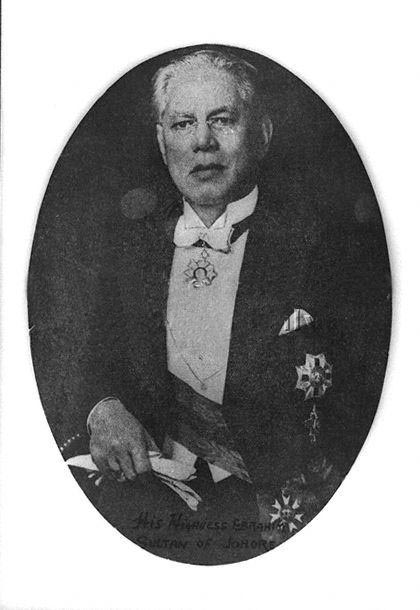
Sultan Ibrahim, 1930s

On 12 May 1937 the Sultan attended the coronation of King George VI and Queen Elizabeth in London, and is said to have renewed the relationship with Hill then, divorced his Scottish wife Helen née Wilson in March 1938, and sailed home in the same month to Singapore and Johor with his new companion and her mother. As they left England it was observed that Hill was wearing a large diamond engagement ring. By May 1938 the young girl from Kent was back in Colombo where there were rumours of an announcement of an engagement before 9 September 1938 between the "platinum blonde" and "former glamour girl" Hill and the 64-year-old divorcee Sultan, but on reaching Singapore the Sultan promptly denied any engagement. The Melbourne Argus quoted from the Daily Express that:

"After the Sultan had divorced his wife recently he went to Ceylon and renewed his acquaintance there with Miss Hill, who was spending a holiday there with her mother. Later the Sultan, Miss Hill and her mother toured Sumatra. Yesterday they went to Singapore by air, presumably on their way to Johore."

The public denial of the engagement may have been associated with political pressure from the British colonial staff at Singapore:

"A cabaret-girl-Sultana the sahibs considered quite impossible. Social royalists, they ganged up and put moral pressure on the precedent-breaking Sultan by unanimously refusing his invitations, although Miss Hill was properly chaperoned at the palace by her mother. The Sultan had his revenge, by ordering the sahibs off his golf course, their children away from his bandstand" ". . . When Singapore's British society behaved stuffily toward his show-girl fiancee, the Sultan struck back by firing all the Britons in his service and planting shrubs on the fairways and greens of the golf course used by the sahibs, which was on his property."

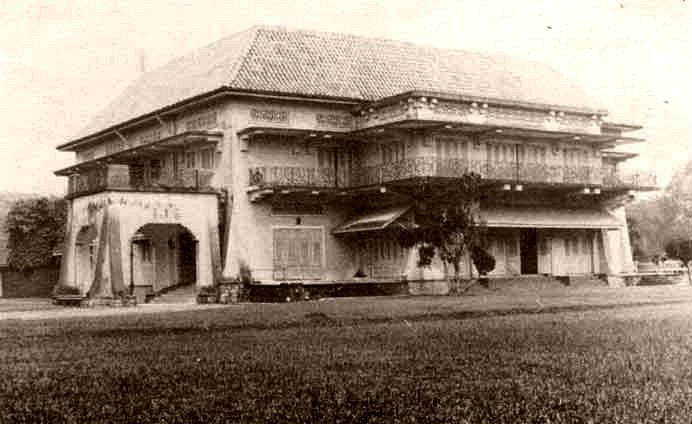
Woodneuk Palace, Singapore

The British Colonial staff sent reports to England that the issue of marrying Miss Hill and a quarrel with the Governor of Straits Settlements had become problematic, and Cissie Hill (wearing a large diamond ring) and her mother were given first class passage on the ship Indrapoera at Singapore to arrive at Southampton dock on 26 July 1938. The Sultan stood publicly on the dock to wave goodbye, before returning to his playboy life in Sumatra. The Press statement by the Sultan was telegraphed as follows:

"I have never suggested marrying Miss Hill (stop) Any suggestion of political implications is a lie (stop) Any suggestion of my not faithfully carrying out all agreements with the British Government is also a lie (stop)"

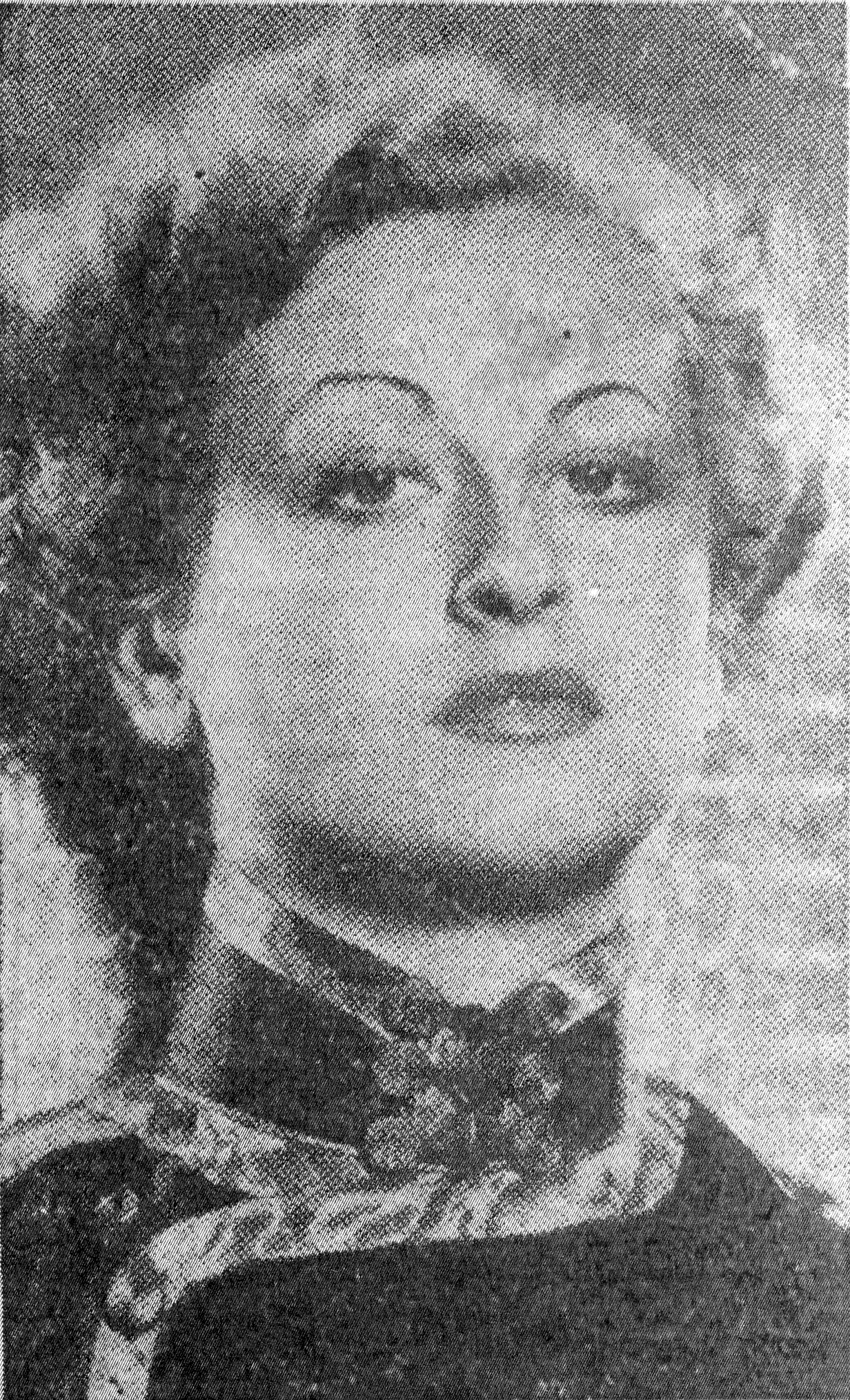
Hill wearing a cheongsam, 1937

By way of explanation for this, on 19 September 1938 a statement was given to the Daily Express by Roland St John Braddell (1880–1966), then legal adviser in Malaya. He said: "As far as I am concerned, I should love to see the Sultan of Johore married to this most charming lady, Miss Lydia Hill." He added that the Sultan could not marry at present because there was no mosque in Genoa where he was staying, because he could do nothing without the permission of the British Government, and because the Sultan was ill: "He nearly died recently in Johore", having "become ill with heart trouble and gout". The lawyer had been instructed to take his wife and daughter and accompany Hill to Genoa, because she kept the Sultan "cheered and tranquil". She had performed an African dance for the Sultan, and accompanied him on a two-hour drive along the coast. Although the Sultan had previously announced an engagement in Malaya, the lawyer now said that he would inform the Press if and when any marriage were to occur. Such an engagement was not unique in east Kent in the 1930s. George Henry Milles-Lade, 4th Earl Sondes who lived at Sheldwich, married Pamela McDougall on 17 October 1939; she was understood to have been previously a Bluebell Girl.

The relationship continued, and in 1939 the Sultan was visiting Switzerland for his health, accompanied by Hill and her mother Florence. Hill lived at Mayfair Court with her parents and sister, E.F.V. Allchin; she never married and was otherwise known as Cissie or Cecily Hill. However she was seen to wear her engagement ring in Herne Bay, and she was known to have nursed the Sultan through a critical illness. The Herne Bay Press said that there were "few people in Herne Bay to whom she was not known, at least by sight, and she had many friends . . . Good natured, she gave support to charitable objects and other causes, and she was the means of bringing happiness to people in straitened circumstances".

== Death ==
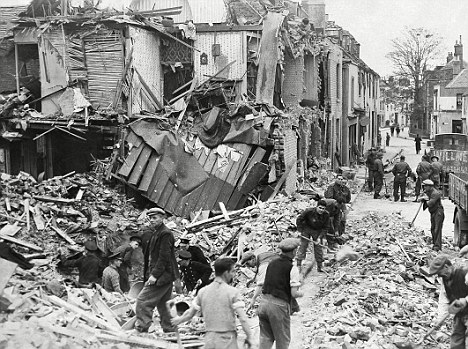
Bomb damage, Canterbury 1940

On 11 October 1940, several Messerschmitts were being chased over Kent in daylight by British fighter planes. The Messerschmitts dropped three bombs on six shops in Burgate, close to Canterbury Cathedral. At least six people were killed and more were injured; it took two days to dig out the dead from the debris. A furrier's received a direct hit, and Hill was killed instantly while shopping for a fur rug as a wedding or birthday gift. She was identified by her jewellery, said to be a gift from the Sultan. Apparently she and her friend Peggy Clark had left Herne Bay at 10.15 am to motor into Canterbury. They had been shopping at Courts, then the friend went to Lefevre's shop and Hill went to the fur shop where she died. She was 27 years old, and the cause was given on her death certificate as "due to War operations". The probate record says she was a spinster living at Mayfair Court, Herne Bay, that she left £16,970 0s 3d and that administration was given to her mother F.C. Hill, wife of George Hill. Her death was announced in The Times.

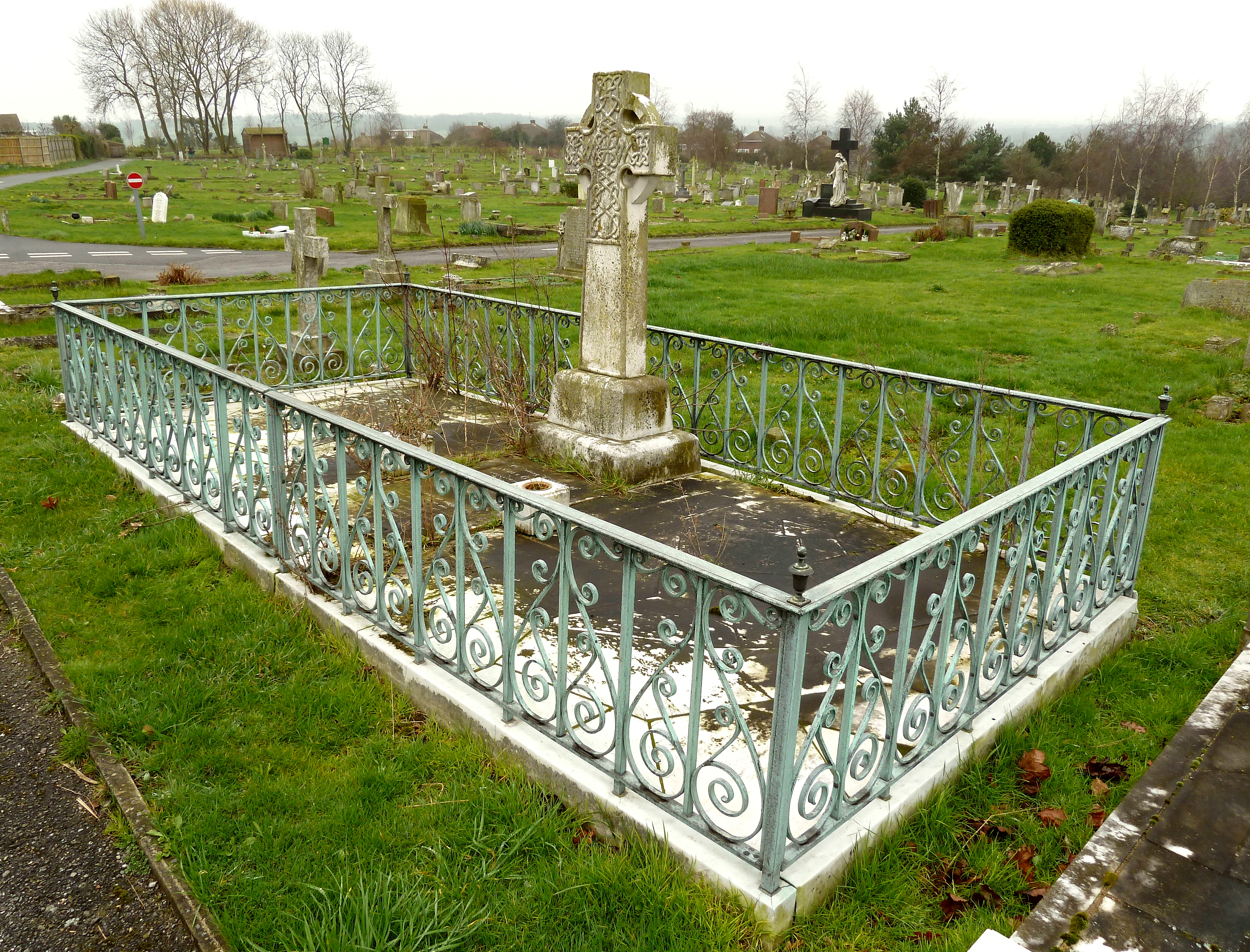
Grave of Lydia Cecilia Hill

The funeral took place on Wednesday 16 October 1940 at St John's Church in Brunswick Square, Herne Bay, Kent. The Reverend A.W. Parry Williams officiated in the church and at the committal by the graveside; there was a surpliced choir at the church service, and the organ played I know that my Redeemer liveth from Handel's Messiah as the coffin was borne into the church. There were many mourners including the Sultan at the church and cemetery, and a large number of floral tributes. The Sultan's wreath was "laid in the grave with the coffin". The interment was at Herne Bay Cemetery at Eddington. In plot BBR46 at the eastern edge of the cemetery is an elaborate, marble monument to her; it is blue and white like her house. It was paid for by the Sultan and adorned with a standing Saxon-style cross, a marble floor with an engraved poem and an iron fence. The inscription says:

"In loving memory of Lydia Cecily Hill; born 20th July 1913; died 11th October 1940. This monument has been erected by a devoted friend.
Somewhere back of the sunset / Where loveliness never dies / She dwells in the land of glory/ 'Neath the blue and gold of the skies /
And we who have lived with and loved her / Whose passing has caused us tears / Will cherish her memory for ever / Down through the passing years."

Sultan Ibrahim owned her grave until his death at the Grosvenor House Hotel in May 1959. Her death is recorded by the Commonwealth War Graves Commission and the certificate is inscribed, "remembered with honour".

== Aftermath ==
Hill was the Sultan's favourite until she died, and he said he was heartbroken. Then, six days later he met a Romanian girl Marcella Mendl aged 25 who was selling Red Cross flags in London, and it was "love at first sight". He courted her for twelve days and during this time he was visiting Hill's parents to give his condolences – and perhaps to retrieve some jewellery that he had given to Hill. On 6 November 1940, less than a month after Hill's death, the Sultan married Miss Mendl at Caxton Hall register office in London; the bride was wearing "a diamond brooch in which the Crown of Johore was flanked by the Sultan's crest, two tiger claws". Hill's parents said that it had come as a great shock to them. By 10 November 1940, the Sultan was telling the Sunday Pictorial: "I prefer to forget the past. It is for the future I want to live."

== Mayfair Court ==
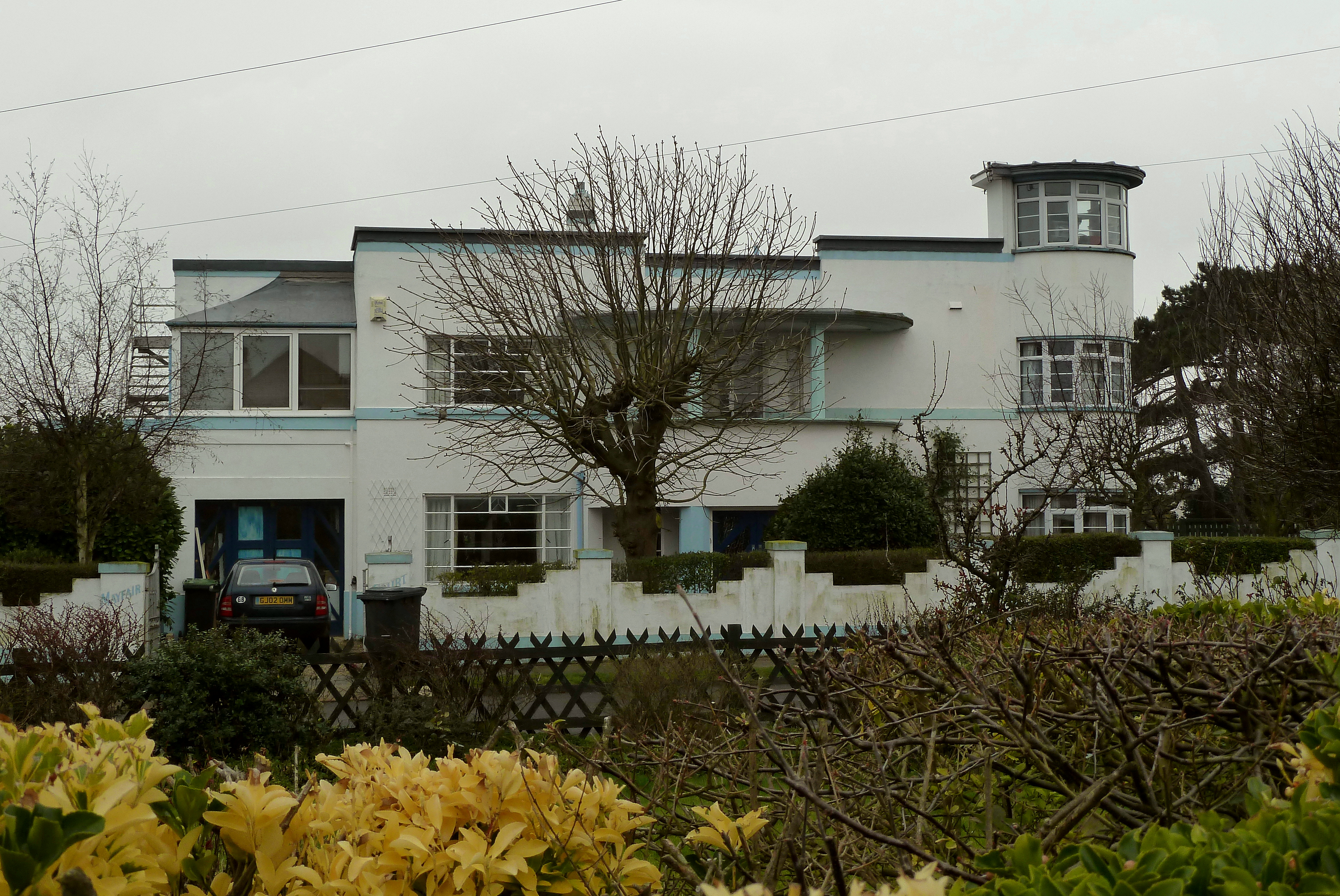
Mayfair Court, built 1934–35

This reinforced concrete Art Deco house has always been painted blue and white; the colour even features on the 1937 plan for an extension. It stands at number two Clifftown Gardens at Westcliff in Herne Bay and was started in 1934 and completed in 1935. Council archives have been lost and the architect is not known. A firm called John Howell & Son was contracted for the extension, greenhouse and air-raid shelter during the 1930s, but it was not John Howell & Son of Hastings; the last partner of that company died in 1903. Although it was funded by the Sultan, Hill was the executive owner of Mayfair Court and the adjoining two Art Deco houses at 139 and 141 Grand Drive from the beginning. She bought a number of 15-foot-wide plots in Clifftown Gardens and Grand Drive, and built Mayfair Court first. In spite of the cancellation of the engagement in 1938, the Sultan continued to fund Mayfair Court and the associated servants' quarters for her. It has also been suggested that the Sultan (via Hill) did not build the associated two houses for servants, but built them to claim the land and to prevent unsightly building by neighbours next door.

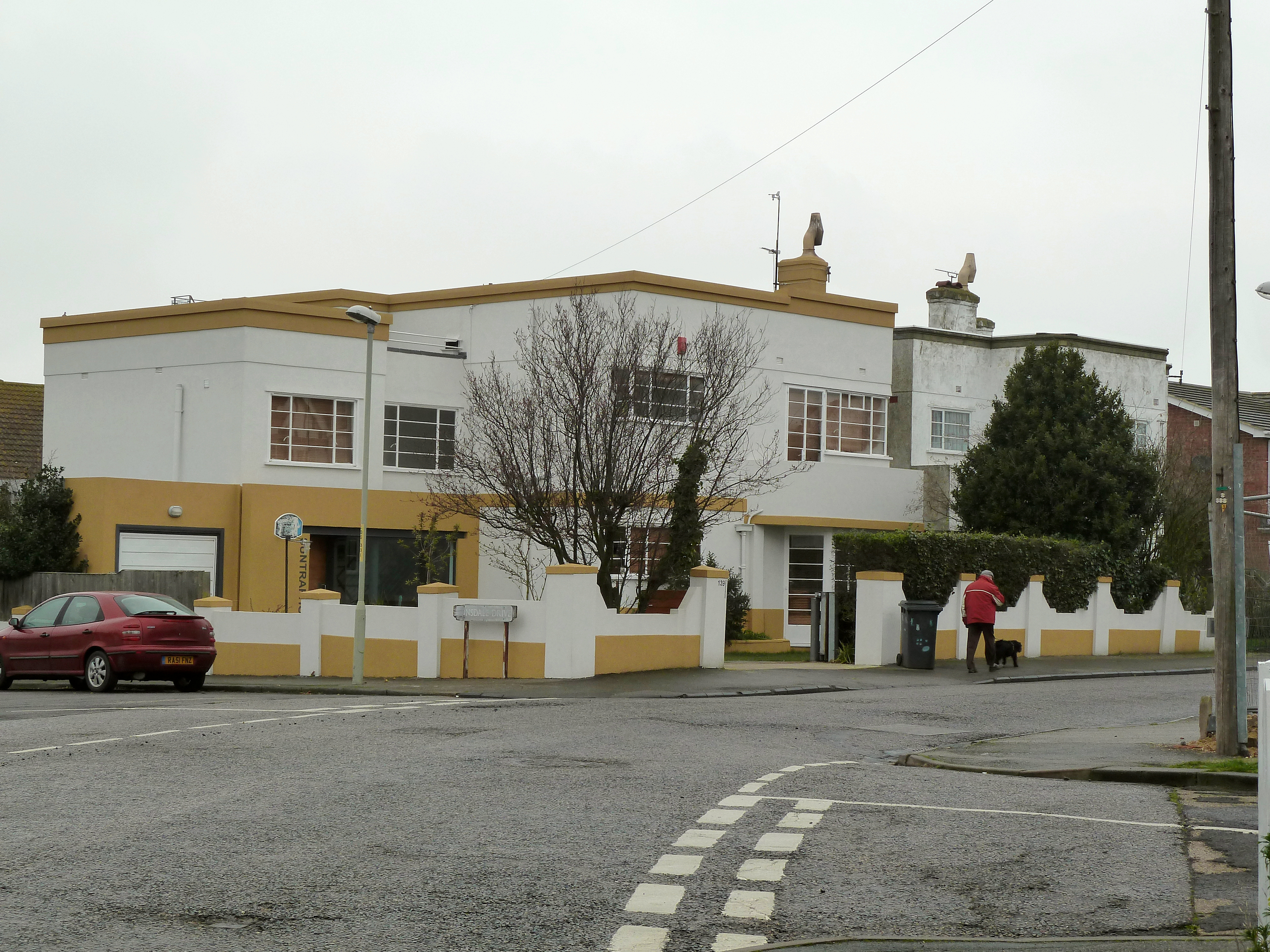
139 and 141 Grand Drive

Hill lived in Mayfair Court with her mother Florence from 1935 until her death in 1940, and from 1935 to 1937 her father George Hill lived there too. In 1937 she applied to build steps and a bedroom to a design by John Howell & Son over the garage at the south end of Mayfair Court. It was approved by the Council in September and completed by November 1937. In 1938 she applied to have a small greenhouse designed by the same architect; it was completed by 10 February 1939. At that time, Mayfair Court stood on an L-shaped plot of land; part of it is now built on. The greenhouse stood on the south-western corner, now occupied by garages. On 22 May 1939 the same architect was employed again to submit an application to build a concrete tube air raid shelter, possibly similar to the Stanton shelter. This was built at the bottom of the garden, parallel with Hampton Pier Avenue.

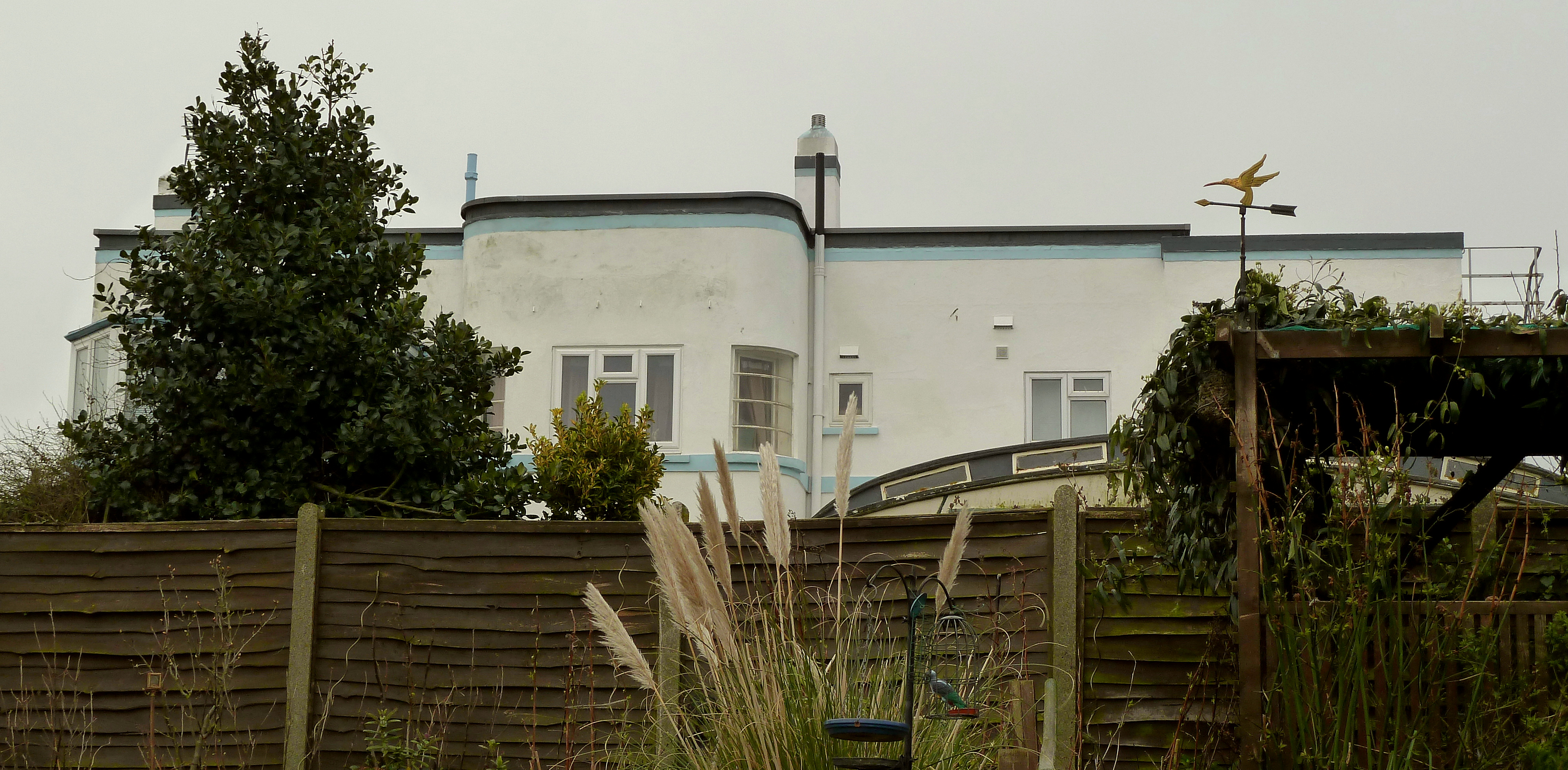
Mayfair Court once had a view across to Sheppey

The World War II usage of the house is not known, but from 1945 it was occupied by Hill's mother Florence until her death in 1973. For some of that time, for example in 1959 and 1969, her father George Hill lived there too. The house was unoccupied in 1974 after Florence's death. Hill's sister and her husband lived at Mayfair Court in 1945, but moved to one of the associated houses in the 1950s (no.141) and to the other in the 1960s (no.139) until the sister left shortly after her husband's death in 1967; she died in 2005.

The survival of Mayfair Court as an architectural asset to its surroundings, and views thereof, has been fragile. In 1984 there were two applications to develop its land with the building of two or three more properties, but both were refused by Canterbury City Council.

== Bibliography ==
- Fishpool, J, A Town at War: Herne Bay in the Second World War: Herne Bay Past Series (Herne Bay Historical Records Society, 3 Dec 2010) ISBN 1-904661-15-7
