= Green Hills =

Green Hills may refer to several places:

- Green Hills, Pennsylvania, United States
- Green Hills, New Hampshire, United States
- Green Hills, Berks County, Pennsylvania, United States
- Green Hills, Nashville, Tennessee, United States
- Green Hills Homestead, a historic homestead in Victoria, Australia
- Green Hills Software, an embedded systems software company
- Bonny Hills, New South Wales, Australia, originally known as Green Hills
- Stockland Green Hills, shopping centre in East Maitland, Australia
- Green Hills, Montana, a fictional town in the 2020 film Sonic the Hedgehog

== See also ==
- Greenhills (disambiguation)
- Green Hill (disambiguation)
- Greenhill (disambiguation)
- Pachaimalai Hills, Tamil Nadu, India (the Tamil name means "green hills")
- "The Green Hills of Earth", a 1947 science-fiction short story by Robert A. Heinlein
