= Joseph Greenhill =

English theological writer

Joseph Greenhill (1704–1788) was an English theological writer.

== Life ==
Greenhill was a nephew of Thomas Greenhill. His father, William (one of a family of thirty-nine children by the same father and mother), was a counsellor-at-law, who lived first in London and then retired to a family estate at Abbot's Langley, Hertfordshire, where Joseph was born and baptised in February 1703–4. He was educated at Sidney Sussex College, Cambridge, graduated B.A. in 1726, and was admitted M.A. in 1731.

Greenhill was appointed rector of East Horsley in 1727, and of East Clandon in 1732, both livings in the county of Surrey, and small both as to population and emolument. He lived at East Horsley, and died there in March 1788.

== Works ==
Greenhill wrote An Essay on the Prophecies of the New Testament, 2nd edition, 1759, and 'A Sermon on the Millennium, or Reign of Saints for a thousand years,' 4th edition. 1772. These two short works he afterwards put together, and republished with the title An Essay on the Prophecies of the New Testament, more especially on the Prophecy of the Millennium, the most prosperous State of the Church of Christ here on Earth for a thousand Years, 7th edition, with additions, Canterbury, 1776.

He was probably the last person who thought it his duty to denounce inoculation from the pulpit, a common habit with the clergy since its introduction in 1718. He published A Sermon on the Presumptuous and Sinful Practice of Inoculation, Canterbury, 1778.
