= Green Hill (Virginia Beach, Virginia) =

Historic house in Virginia, United States

- U.S. National Register of Historic Places
- Virginia Landmarks Register
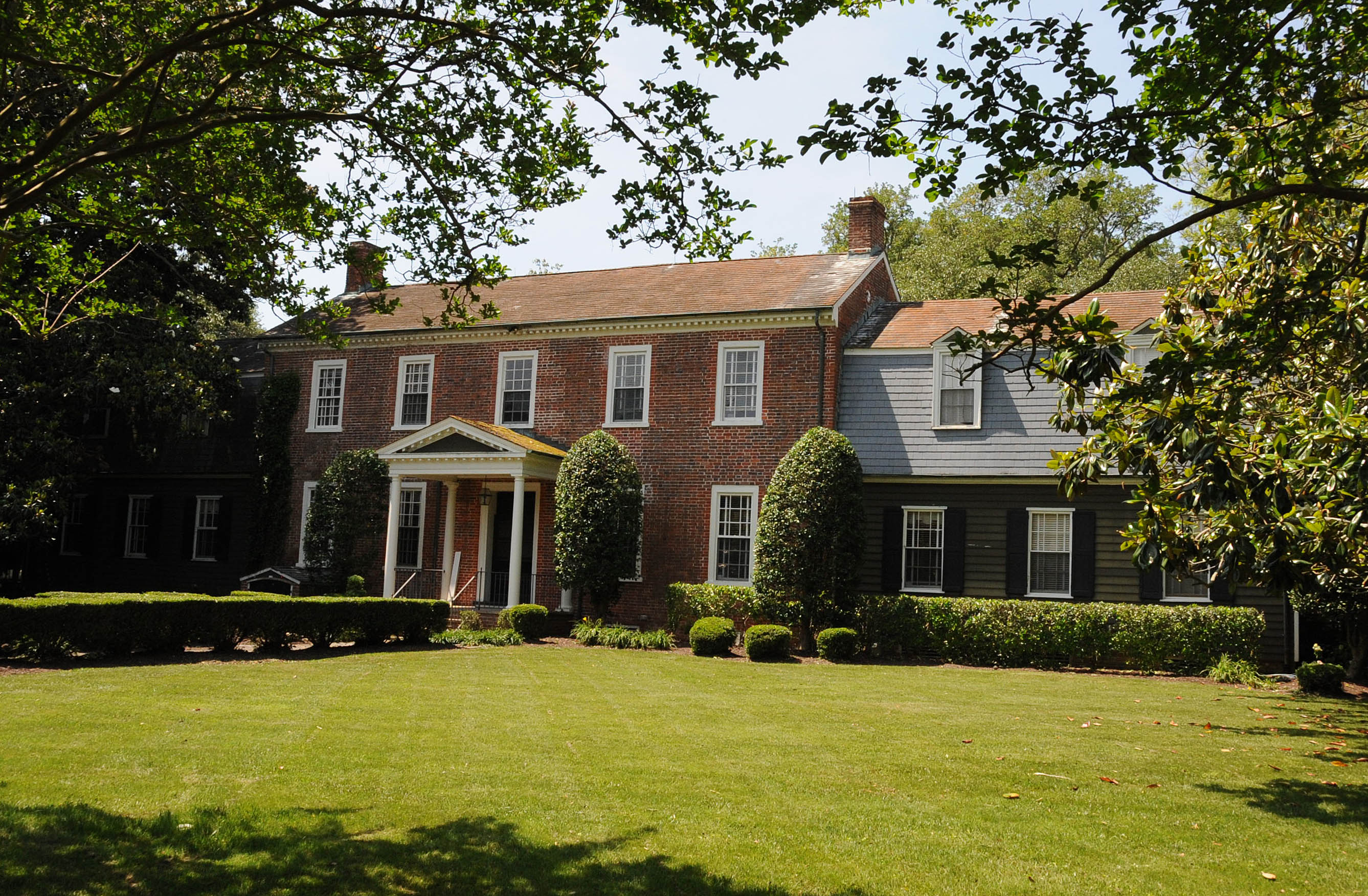

- Location within Virginia Location within the United States
- Location: 1721 Lovetts Pond Lane, Virginia Beach, Virginia
- Coordinates: 36°53′55″N 76°03′20″W
- Area: 1.333 acres (0.539 ha)
- Built: c. 1791, 1954
- Built by: John Lovett
- Architect: Finlay F. Ferguson, Jr.
- Architectural style: Georgian, Federal
- NRHP reference No.: 12001273
- VLR No.: 134-0015

Significant dates
- Added to NRHP: February 5, 2013
- Designated VLR: December 13, 2012

Green Hill is a historic plantation house located at Virginia Beach, Virginia. It was built about 1791, and is a two-story, five-bay, double pile, Georgian / Federal style brick dwelling. Two two-story wings were added in 1954.

It was added to the National Register of Historic Places in 2013.
