= Greenhill, Camden =

Area in the London Borough of Camden, England

Coordinates: 51.555°N 0.175°W

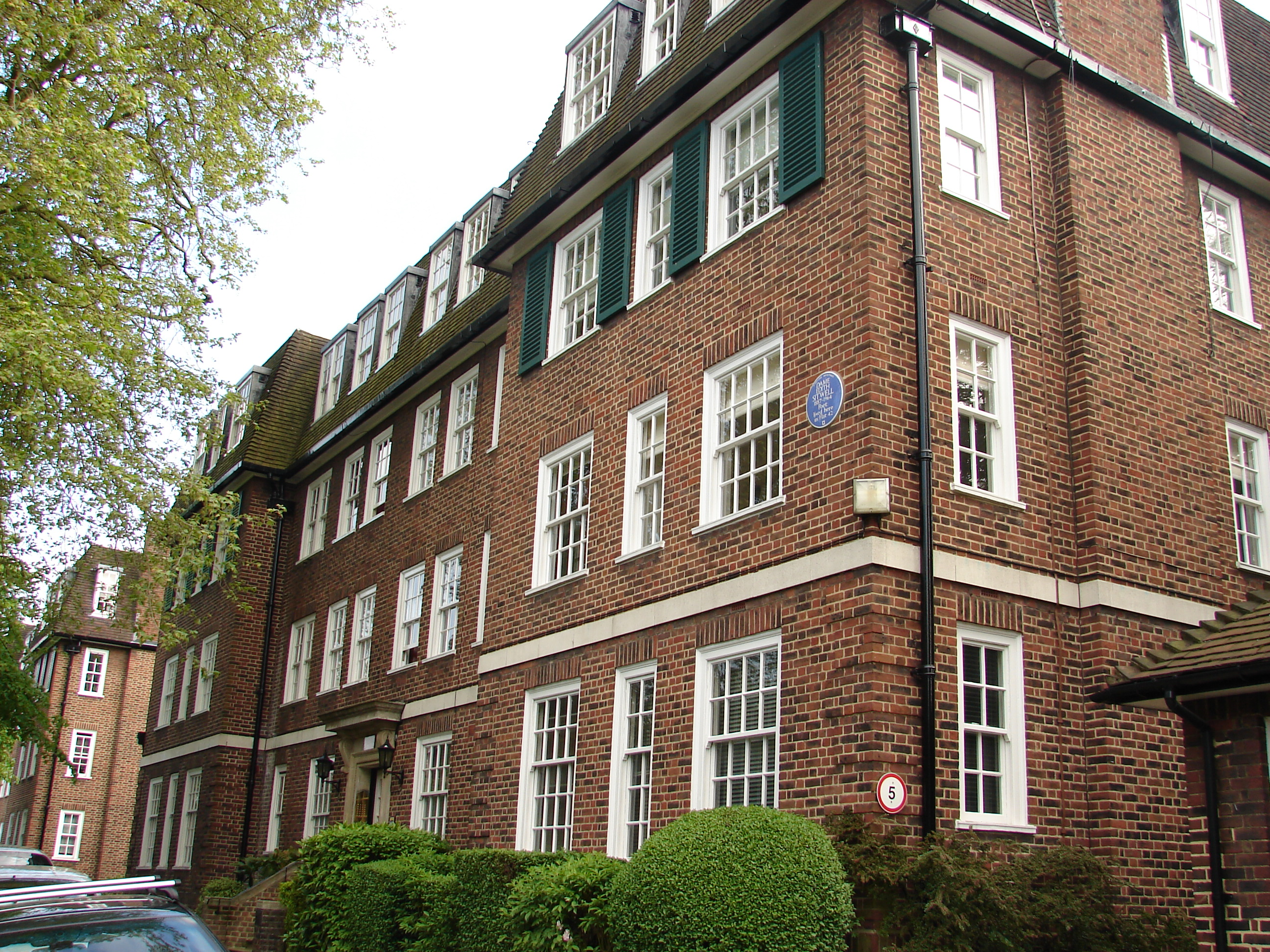
Greenhill mansion flats

Greenhill is an area of Hampstead in the London Borough of Camden in Greater London. The name is topographically derived.

The name was applied to a housing estate built here in 1869, to a block of mansion flats built in 1936, and to the local Greenhill Road. Dame Edith Sitwell lived in Greenhill flats from 1961 until shortly before her death in 1964, now marked by an English Heritage blue plaque.
