= Green Hill (Hillsborough, North Carolina) =

Plantation house in Hillsborough, North Carolina

Coordinates: 36°4′11″N 79°3′53″W

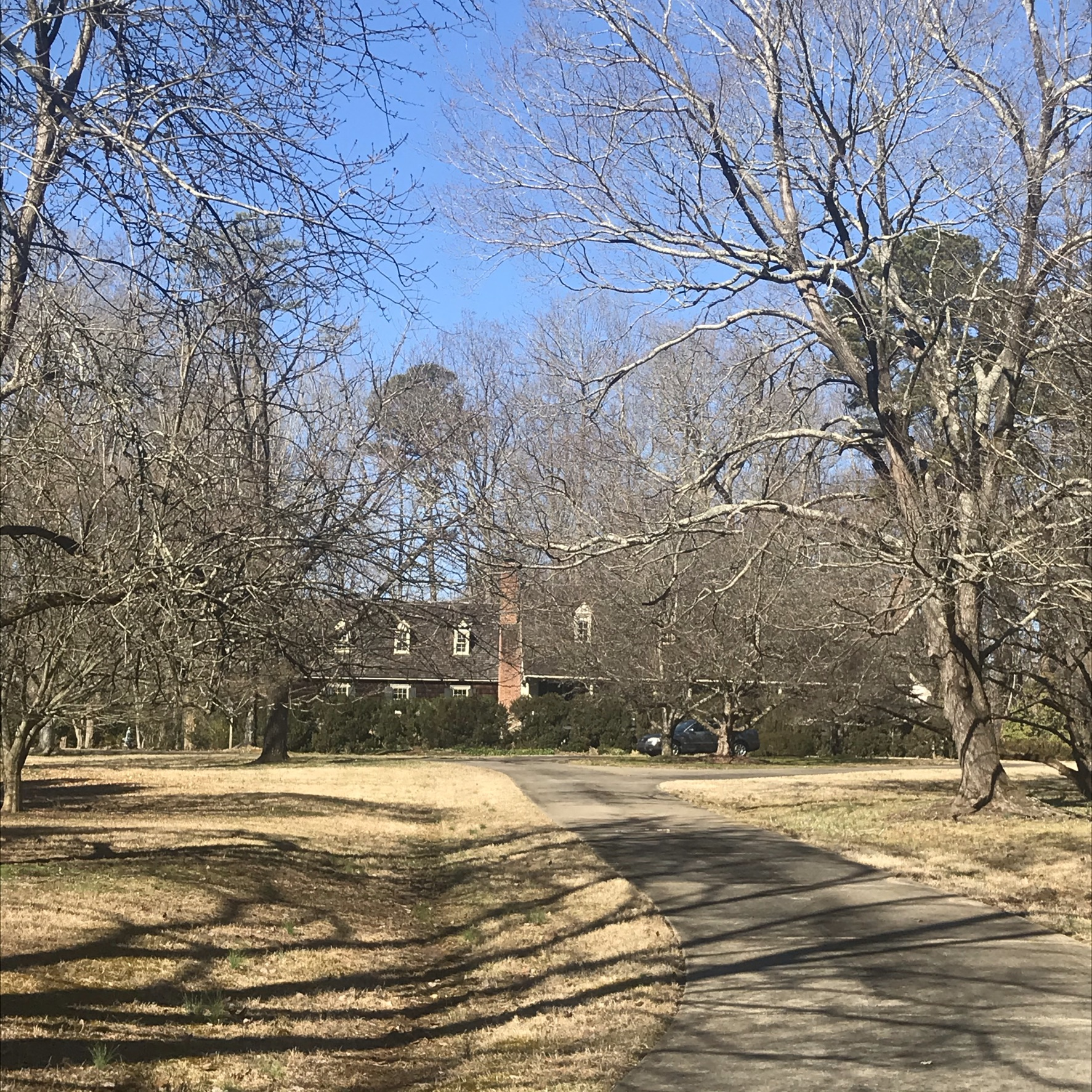
Green Hill in 2021

Green Hill, or Greenhill, is a Federal style plantation house in Hillsborough, North Carolina. The house originally sat on a plantation near Turkey Farm Road, which was given in a land grant by George II of Great Britain to Charles Wilson Johnston. The house was moved to a new location in the late 1960s.

== History ==
The original house was built around 1750 in Orange County, North Carolina, near the town of Hillsborough, on land gifted as a land grant by George II of Great Britain to Charles Wilson Johnston. The plantation stayed in the Johnston family for many generations, and fifty-three members of the family were born in the house's study. George Johnston made additions to the house in 1784. The front hall addition was likely built in 1820, the parlor in 1850, and the second floor of the home was added in 1890.

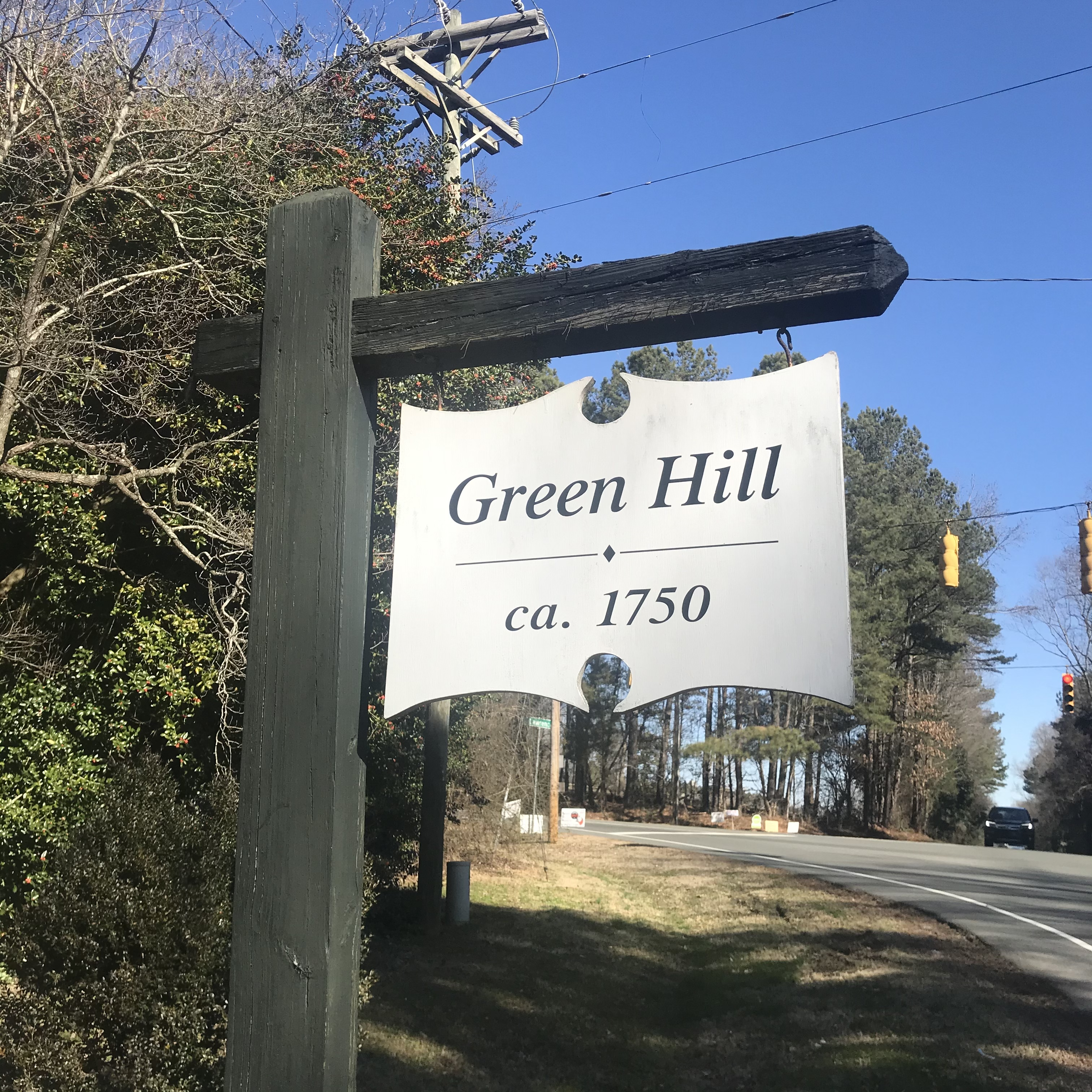
Sign at the entrance to Green Hill

In the 1960s Green Hill passed to the Coman family and was moved twelve miles away from its former site, near Turkey Farm Road, to the corner of Lawrence Road and Interstate 42. The house was moved to make way for commercial development. The Johnston family cemetery was moved between 1966 and 1967 from the original land to New Hope Cemetery. The plantation's cemetery for enslaved people remains in the original location. James H. Coman, Jr. made extensive renovations to Green Hill and restored many of the original settings of the house, with the help of the State Archives of North Carolina, including the windows, cornice, mantels, baseboards, window trims, and hand carved paneling. The house sits on 9.7 acres.

In 2021 the home was for sale.
