= Greenhill, County Durham =

Village in County Durham, England

Coordinates: 54.815°N 1.385°W

Greenhill is a village in County Durham, England. It is situated a few miles south of Sunderland, and adjoins Murton.
