= Greensill =

Greensill is a surname. Notable people with the surname include:

- Angeline Greensill (born 1948), New Zealand academic and Māori activist
- Bruce Greensill (1942–2007), Australian rugby union player
- Lex Greensill (born 1977), Australian businessman and banker

== See also ==
- Greensill Capital
- Greensill scandal
