= Green Hill Cemetery =

Green Hill Cemetery may refer to:

- Green Hill Cemetery (Amsterdam, New York)
- Green Hill Cemetery (Waynesville, North Carolina)
- Green Hill Cemetery (Greensboro, North Carolina)
- Green Hill Cemetery (Martinsburg, West Virginia)
- Green Hill Commonwealth War Graves Commission Cemetery, in Turkey

== See also ==
- Green Hill Cemetery Gatekeeper's House, in Greensboro, North Carolina
