= Greenhill, Nova Scotia =

Community in Nova Scotia, Canada

Coordinates: 45°33′51.93″N 62°48′10.19″W

Greenhill in Nova Scotia

Greenhill is an unincorporated community in the Canadian province of Nova Scotia, located in Pictou County.
