= Green Hill, West Virginia =

- Unincorporated community
- Location within West Virginia Location within the United States
- Coordinates: 39°38′18″N 80°46′30″W
- Country: United States
- State: West Virginia
- County: Wetzel
- Elevation: 1,289 ft (393 m)
- Time zone: UTC-5 (Eastern (EST))
  - Summer (DST): UTC-4 (EDT)
- Area codes: 304 & 681
- GNIS feature ID: 1539672

Green Hill is an unincorporated community in Wetzel County, West Virginia, United States. Green Hill is located east of New Martinsville.
