= Greenhill Ogham Stones =

Ogham stones (national monument) in County Cork, Ireland

- Clocha Oghaim Phlácais (Irish)
- Location within Ireland
- 52.077603°N 8.606824°W
- Type: ogham stones
- Location: Greenhill, Mourneabbey, County Cork, Ireland

History
- Built: AD 400–550

Site notes
- Elevation: 51 m (167 ft)
- Owner: private

National monument of Ireland
- Official name: Greenhill
- Reference no.: 552

Greenhill Ogham Stones (CIIC 57–58) are two ogham stones forming a National Monument located in County Cork, Ireland.

== Location ==
Greenhill Ogham Stones are located 7.4 km (4.6 mi) south-southeast of Mallow.

== History ==
The stones were carved in the 5th century AD. Greenhill I is dated to the early 6th century, and Greenhill II to the 5th century (first half, or early second half).

== Description ==
Greenhill I measures 260 × 72 × 35 cm. The inscription is TṚENỤ [MA]QỊ MUCOI QRITTI (of Trén/Trian son of the descendant of Creth? (Crothrige?)')

Greenhill II measures 154 × 46 × 36 cm. The inscription is CATTUBUTTAS Ṃ[AQI] (of Cathub [son of])
