= Thomas Greenhill (surgeon) =

English surgeon (1667?–1740)

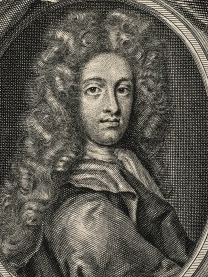
Thomas Greenhill Line engraving 1705

Thomas Greenhill (1669?–1740) was a surgeon who worked in London and was also author of a book Νεκροκηδεία (Greek, literally Dead-funeral) or The Art of Embalming on embalming. He was also surgeon to Henry Howard, 7th Duke of Norfolk. He was born after the death of his father, William Greenhill, the last of 39 children born to Elizabeth Greenhill.

== Life ==
According to the Oxford Dictionary of National Biography, "Most of the basic details of his life are a matter for conjecture. Essential parish papers have been mutilated ... Papers concerning his family shed no direct light on his education, practice, family, or death." This lack of records seems to be due to discontinuing the recording of baptisms and other records when Cromwell was in power during the Commonwealth following the English Civil War. The Dictionary of National Biography observes that "he was born ..after his father's death, probably at Abbot's Langley, Hertfordshire, as his father died there". He then lived in King Street Bloomsbury in London. His father was William Greenhill, Secretary to General Monck, and his mother was Elizabeth Greenhill (1615–1679) of Harrow in Middlesex and Abbots Langley.

== Embalming ==
His book Νεκροκηδεία or The Art of Embalming wherein is shewn the right of burial, and funeral ceremonies, especially that of preserving bodies after the Egyptian method was published in 1705. Its main concern was to advocate the importance of embalming for the burial of the aristocracy, and make it a task limited to surgeons and not "undertakers and quacks". The argument is based upon appeals to Antiquary, Greek and Roman Classics and Scripture and takes the form of three letters: the first to Charles Bernard, Serjeant Surgeon to Queen Anne, the second, John Lawson, the former president of the Royal College of Physicians and the third to Hans Sloane, secretary to the Royal Society. Its dedication is to Thomas Herbert, 8th Earl of Pembroke, the same person who was the dedicatee of John Locke's An Essay Concerning Human Understanding. It was funded by subscription including Thomas Tenison the then Archbishop of Canterbury. The book had little effect and was dismissed by William Hunter in his The art of embalming dead bodies. It has however been described as providing "rich evidence on attitudes to death, of early eighteenth-century antiquarianism and Egyptology, and the medical politics of the day, in an accessible and interesting blend."

== Elizabeth Greenhill ==
Elizabeth Greenhill and her husband William Greenhill were the parents of Thomas Greenhill, who is reported to be the last of the 39 children that the couple had. The family consisted of 7 sons and 32 daughters. Only 2 of them were twins, which is unusual as the most common cause of such a large number of children, hyperovulation, typically manifests as multiple births.

According to a letter in the Gentleman's Magazine in 1805 there exists preserved on the back of a small portrait identified as that of Mrs Greenhill, mother of Thomas Greenhill, the following words. Similar words according to Notes and Queries in 1852 are also inscribed in a copy of Thomas Greenhill's The Art of Embalming.

She had 39 children by one husband. They were all born alive, and baptised and all single births save one. The last child, who was born after his father's death, was a surgeon in King-street, Bloomsbury, and wrote the above book, which he was desirous to bring into fashion. She was heard to say by a credible witness, with whom I [the person whose signature attests it] was well acquainted, that she believed, if her husband had lived, she might have had two or three more children. [signed] Rich. Ashby, a clergyman.

Reflecting this unusual circumstance of birth, he was granted a version of his father's coat of arms in 1698 that commemorated "his being the thirty-ninth child of one father and mother."" It consists of "Vert 2 bars of ermine, in chief a lion passant guardant or" and a demi-griffin for its crest differenced by 39 mullets. Its motto was "Honos Alit Artes" or "Honour Nourishes the Arts".
