= Greenhill, Kent =

Suburb of Herne Bay, Kent, England

Coordinates: 51.360°N 1.103°E

Greenhill
- Location within Kent
- Population: 7,339 (2001) (Parish)
- OS grid reference: TR166667
- Civil parish: Herne and Broomfield
- District: City of Canterbury
- Shire county: Kent
- Region: South East
- Country: England
- Sovereign state: United Kingdom
- Post town: HERNE BAY
- Postcode district: CT6
- Dialling code: 01227
- Police: Kent
- Fire: Kent
- Ambulance: South East Coast
- UK Parliament: Canterbury

Greenhill is an outlying suburb of the coastal town of Herne Bay, in Kent in southeast England. The erstwhile Thanet Way, now renumbered as the A2990 road, separates Greenhill from Herne Bay.

Greenhill is home to Thornden Wood Primary School for children aged from 4–11 years and Herne Bay High School for children aged from 11 to 18, a sports college which very recently gained its sports status. Greenhill has its own Gymnastics Club and a wide range of community groups and organisations.

Residents also set up the first Partners and Communities Together panel, PACT, in Kent and were the first to launch a dedicated website. The panel is currently trying to gauge public opinion on the subject of having Greenhill officially reclassified as a village in its own right instead of part of Herne Bay.
