= Mortimer George Thoyts =

High Sheriff in Southern England

Mortimer George Thoyts (1804–1875) was a Victorian High Sheriff of Berkshire and a captain in the Royal Berkshire Militia.

Mortimer was born on 6 November 1804 at Sulhamstead House in Berkshire, the only son of William Thoyts of that place and his wife, Jane, the daughter and co-heiress of the famous city grocer, Abram Newman. of Mount Bures in Suffolk. He inherited the Sulhamstead estate in 1817 and became Captain in the Royal Berkshire Militia on 15 June 1832 and resigned 13 March 1833. In 1839, he was pricked High Sheriff of Berkshire. He was presented by the electors of Berkshire with a fine portrait of himself, painted by J. Horsley, R.A., for the work he had done politically, although he refused to represent the county in Parliament.

He married three times:

- 4 March 1828, at Padworth in Berkshire, to Emma, daughter of Thomas Bacon of Aberavon, South Wales, who rented Benham Park and Padworth House, and afterwards lived at Redlands House in Reading, all in Berkshire. Her grandfather was Anthony Bacon, the industrialist. They were the grandparents of the historian Emma Elizabeth Thoyts.
- 14 October 1848, at Marylebone in Middlesex, to Catherine Aurora, the daughter of Robert Sherson, of Fetcham in Surrey, and widow of Capt. John Smith of Tilehurst in Berkshire.
- 1871, at Manchester in Lancashire, Catherine, daughter of Mr. James, Esq. and widow of Rev. Robert Sherson of Yaverland on the Isle of Wight.

M. G. Thoyts died on 18 January 1875 at his home and was buried in St. Michael's Churchyard at Sulhamstead Bannister.

Honorary titles
Preceded by Winchcombe Henry Howard Hartley	High Sheriff of Berkshire; 1839	Succeeded by Henry Hippisley
