= George Mortimer =

George Mortimer may refer to:

- George Ferris Whidborne Mortimer (1805–1871), English schoolmaster and divine
- George Frederick Baskerville Mortimer (1816–1854), English cricketer
- George Mortimer (officer), Marine officer who wrote an account of a voyage of John Henry Cox in 1791

== See also ==
- George Mortimer Bibb (1776–1859), American politician
- George Mortimer Morris (1871–1954), British Indian Army officer
- George Mortimer Pullman (1831–1897), American engineer and industrialist
- Mortimer George Thoyts (1804–1875), English High Sheriff of Berkshire
