= Monkhouse Davison =

English merchant, importer, grocer (1713–1793)

- Born: December 1713; Carlisle, England, UK
- Died: 12 May 1793 (aged 79); London, England
- Occupation(s): Merchant, importer, grocer
- Employer(s): Davison, Newman and Co.

Monkhouse Davison (1713–1793) was the senior partner in one of the leading grocers in 18th century London, Davison Newman and Co., that imported a wide range of produce including tea, coffee, sugar and spices. The company is best known today for the disposal of chests of its tea in the Boston Tea Party at the start of the American Revolution. Products branded with the company name are still being sold, over 360 years after its foundation.

Monkhouse was born to wealthy parents Isaac and Jane Davison of Cowdall Hall (later known as Coledale Hall) in Newtown, on the outskirts of Carlisle, Cumbria. The name "Monkhouse" came from his mother's maiden name. Her family lived five miles away in Dalston, Cumbria.

He had six siblings. John, who was born 13 years earlier in 1700 (who also became a grocer and served as the mayor of Carlisle in 1765), Jane in 1702, Isaac in 1703, Jacob in 1705, Thomas in 1716 and Mary in 1720. We know that Thomas also worked in the Davison Newman business until he died. The cost of his lavish funeral is recorded in detail.

== Early years ==
It's probable that father Isaac accumulated his wealth from a grocery business in Carlisle which led to three sons pursuing this line. Monkhouse must have moved to London in his early 20s to embark on his career probably as a result of a family connection with the Rawlinson family living 47 miles away in Hawkshead, close to Windermere in Cumbria.

Daniel Rawlinson of Grizedale Hall, 1614–79, became a wine merchant in London. His son Sir Thomas Rawlinson was born in London in 1647 became Lord Mayor in 1706, and his great nephew, also called Thomas Rawlinson, ran a grocery business in Creechurch Lane in the City of London.

We don't know exactly when Monkhouse Davison joined the company "Thomas Rawlinson" but he was admitted to the Grocers' Company "by redemption" in 1738, when he was 25. By 1753 (when Monkhouse was 40) the company was called "Rawlinson and Davison" and described as "dealers in coffee, tea, chocolate, snuff, etc". Rawlinson died in 1769 and the company name was changed to "Davison Newman and Company".

At the age of 28, in 1764, Abram Newman, of Mount Bures in Essex, joined Monkhouse (who at this time was 51) and became a partner in the business. On 12 June 1759, he married Mary (1720–1783), the sister of Monkhouse Davison. Five years later, the senior partner, Sir Thomas Rawlinson died and the company became known, as it is today, as Davison Newman and Co.

== Huge business expansion ==
The growth of the company is well documented in Owen Rutter's history of Davison Newman called At the three sugar loaves and crown. He observed that, over a hundred-year period, the five earliest owners of the business - that's Walter Ray, Thomas Rawlinson, Monkhouse Davison, Abram Newman and William Thwaytes - each earned a fortune from the business.

An obituary for Abram in 1799 read "He was one of the richest citizens of London, and a happy instance of the wonderful powers of accumulation by the steady pursuit of honourable industry. Without speculation or adventure he acquired £600,000 as a grocer."

The vast range of produce traded included almonds, chocolate, confectionery, coffee from Turkey and Jamaica, figs, ginger, mustard, nuts, pepper, prunes, rice, snuff, sugar, tea from China, tobacco and truffles.

The company accounts, in the mid 18th century, show that in just nine months £53,000 (about £80 million in today's money) of goods, mostly spices, were being imported from John Goddard in Rotterdam.

== Davison's tea leads to American Independence ==
The Davison and Newman customers were not only located across the British Isles but the company regularly shipped to North America. Over five months a Dublin merchant bought £6000 of tea (£9 million), spices and pepper, etc., a Bristol merchant in four months spent £4500, a Hull merchant spent £3842 in six months, and so on. The company must have been one of, if not the, largest grocery wholesaler in England. But they also had at least one retail outlet located in the City of London.

In 1774, chests of tea from the company were amongst those thrown into Boston Harbour during the Boston Tea Party which started the American Revolution. The company sought compensation from George III for £480 for the loss of the tea.

== Personal life ==
He played the guitar. The surviving eighteenth century company records ensure an unusually good insight into the daily transactions of the business. But much less is known about the day-to-day lives of its directors.

Public records show that both Monkhouse and Abram were generous benefactors. Davison was a trustee of Theatre Royal, Drury Lane and financially supported at least one production. He also contributed to the Foundling Hospital. We know that he provided the first public riverside walk for Carlisle and gave an annual dole for the poor. Monkhouse's sister, Jane who lived in Carlisle, was described as "a lady of exemplary piety and unbounded charity." Abram generously bequeathed money to six hospitals in his will.

In 1781 an Old Bailey trial found a pickpocket, William Posser, guilty of stealing Monkhouse's cambric handkerchief. The thief was sentenced to be whipped.

Monkhouse was a friend of Henry Laurens, an American merchant and rice planter from South Carolina, who became a political leader during the Revolutionary War. In a letter of August 1763 he writes to Monkhouse "I am glad you are so happy in your nieces. May your pleasures daily increase but I should be rather more pleas’d to hear that you had some sons and daughters of your own".

He was also a friend of James Oakes who lived in Bury St Edmunds. Oakes had inherited one of the largest yarn-making companies in the country. Later he was made Receiver General of the Land Tax for West Suffolk and was to become a banker. Oakes' diaries span 50 years of his business life and provide a vivid insight into Georgian England. He records many visits to see his friend Monkhouse. He frequently had breakfast or supper at his London home. In November 1783 he "... had to rush back to Fenchurch Street because Mr Newman's brother-in law and business partner, Monkhouse Davison, was ill." An entry in May 1793 records his friend's death.

== Dalston Hall ==
Monkhouse Davison, in 1761 bought Dalston Hall, in Dalston, Cumbria from Sir George Dalston, 4th Baronet and owned the property for 32 years until his death.

== Rose Hall, St Thomas in the Vale, Jamaica ==
When Monkhouse was 76, in 1789, Davison Newman and Co. bought a 4/18 share in a property of 1,200 acres (approximately 2 sq miles) known as Rose Hall in the parish of St Thomas in the Vale located 20 miles north west of Kingston at what is now called Linstead. This Rose Hall is not to be confused with the better known Rose Hall, Montego Bay, Jamaica). The estate was the source of sugar and other produce for export to the UK and US. The old slave muster-book, dating from 1784 to 1819, shows that in 1784 the total slave labour force was: 82 men, 72 women, 39 boys, 27 girls, a total of 220. By 1819 the total was 256. By 1834, William Thwaytes (1749–1834) was sole owner of Davison Newman and Co. He left his shares to his wife Ann Thwaytes who paid for the erection of Herne Bay Clock Tower in 1836.

== Will and final resting place ==
Monkhouse died at his home in Fenchurch Street in May 1793. His will included a list of the following properties: his main London home in Fenchurch Street, in Essex: Porter's at Rippleside, Essex and Gale Street in Barking, in Cumbria: Coledale Hall, Carlisle, Dalston Hall, Dalston, Hill Top and the Gill near Kendal.

The only reference found to a possible marriage is a letter with "Happy marriage greetings" in February 1776 when Monkhouse was 63. In his will there were to be no direct heirs to his estates and no mention of a wife.

Abram and Monkhouse were buried together in All Hallows Staining but after the collapse of the crypt their monument was to be seen in the church of St Olave Hart Street, London until it suffered bomb damage in May 1941 in the Second World War.
