= William Thoyts =

High Sheriff in Southern England

William Thoyts (1767–1817) was High Sheriff of Berkshire.

William was born in 1767 in Bishopsgate, the son of John Thoyts of Sulhamstead House in Berkshire and his wife, Mary, the daughter of Thomas Burfoot, the Treasurer of Christ's Hospital. He inherited his father's estates, centred on Sulhamstead Abbots, at the age of only eight and shortly afterwards united them with the manor of Sulhamstead Bannister, which had been purchased by his grandfather William Thoyts in 1774. He had two younger brothers Thomas and John. It had been his father's will that he should become a coppersmith and run the family business at the age of 24. He appears to have had little interest in it and had sold it by December 1807.

In 1788, he married Jane, the daughter and co-heiress of Abram Newman of Mount Bures, Essex, the famous London tea merchant. They had a large family of ten children, including Jane, the wife of William Best, 2nd Baron Wynford, and their heir, Mortimer George Thoyts, who was the grandfather of the palaeographer, historian and genealogist, Emma Elizabeth Thoyts.

In 1795, William became High Sheriff of Berkshire. In 1800, he rebuilt the family home largely as it stands today, minus the famous portico. William died in November 1817 and was buried in the family vault beneath St Mary's Church, Sulhamstead Abbots.
