= William Mortimer =

William Mortimer may refer to:

- William Mortimer (rugby union) (1874–1916), English rugby union forward
- William Mortimer (architect) (1841/42–1913), English architect
- William Mortimer (cricketer) (1833–1916), English cricketer and British Army officer
- William James Mortimer (died 2010), publisher, president and editor of the Deseret News
- William Chapman Mortimer (1907–1988), Scottish novelist
