= Abraham Newman =

Abraham Newman may refer to:

- Abram Newman (1736–1799), one of the wealthiest men in 18th century London
- Abraham L. Newman (born 1973), American political scientist and professor
