= Sergeants Orchard =

Nature reserve in Essex, England

Coordinates: 51.943°N 0.775°E

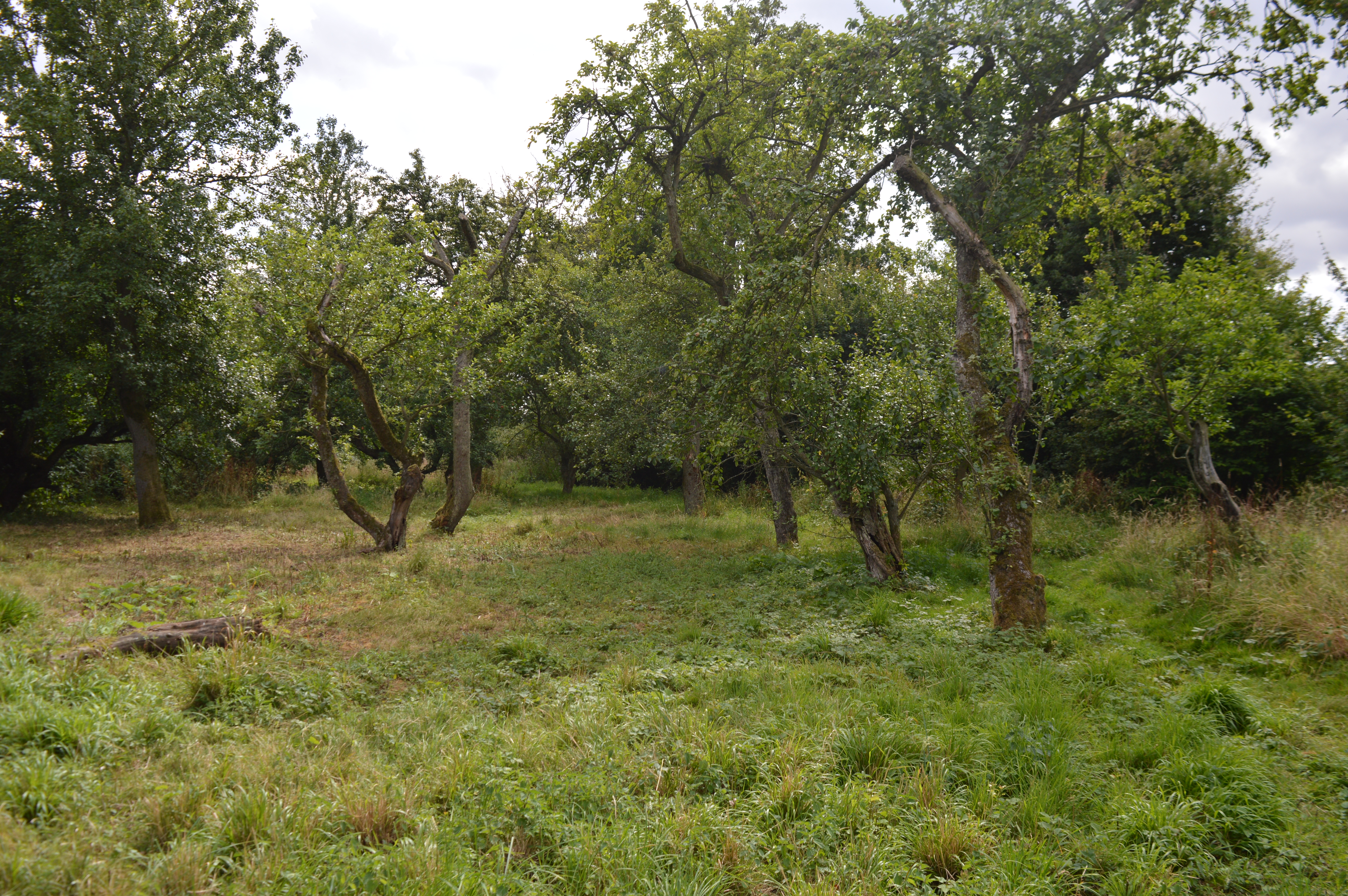
- The old orchard
- Interactive map of Sergeants Orchard
- Type: Nature reserve
- Location: Mount Bures, Essex
- OS grid: TL 907 308
- Area: 3.2 hectares (7.9 acres)
- Manager: Essex Wildlife Trust

Sergeants Orchard is a 3.2-hectare (7.9-acre) nature reserve in Mount Bures and north of Chappel in Essex. It is owned and managed by the Essex Wildlife Trust.

The site was left to the Trust by the owner of Sergeants Farm in 1995. It consists of an old orchard in a long narrow field, another narrow field to the west and a larger one to the east. The western field has been planted with fruit trees and the eastern one with a conservation grass mix. A rare bee, Bombus muscorum, has been found on the site.

There is access from a footpath between Fordham Road and Balls Chace
