= Evelyn Whitaker =

English children's writer

Evelyn Whitaker (1844–1929) was an English children's writer, whose work was described as charming, pure and wholesome. She displays strong sensitivity to poverty and to illness. Her books were published anonymously.

== Background ==
Whitaker was born in Herne Bay, Kent, the seventh child of Edward Whitaker (born 1802), a solicitor originally from Bratton, Wiltshire and previously and later of London and Middlesex, and his wife Emily Ann Woolbert (died before 1851). Eleanor attended the Ladies College in Bedford Square, which later developed into Bedford College and became part of the University of London. She died in Hammersmith, now London, at the age of 84, having remained a spinster all her life and lived often with one or more of her sisters.

All Whitaker's works were published anonymously – her identity was not revealed until 1903. Her 19 novels and several shorter stories were issued by multiple publishers in Britain, Australia, Canada and the United States between 1879 and 1915. Many of the editions were beautifully bound and illustrated, while Whitaker's writing style was praised as "a study in English for its conciseness, simplicity, and elegance" and Tip Cat was adopted as a textbook for German students studying English. Her stories were described as "charming, pure, and wholesome", full of "humour and pathos".

For more than a decade after Evelyn Whitaker's death, her two most popular titles, Miss Toosey's Mission and Laddie, continued to be reissued as gift books. Such little novels with religious or moral themes were given as Sunday School prizes, often as attendance awards. Most were inexpensively made in terms of their paper, ink and illustrations, but attractively bound.

== Themes ==
Evelyn Whitaker's novels show intimate knowledge of life in a vicarage and in a doctor's household. Such homes are frequently settings in her novels. Her writings reflect her traditional Anglican view of religion. In Miss Toosey's Mission, Tip Cat, and Lil she comments on Puseyites, Dissenters, and Methodism. Her works display a fondness for the childhood nursery, dogs and flowers. She makes frequent use of the Victorian language of flowers, relates the blessings and burdens of children rich and poor, and knows well the streets of London and the rustic beauty of the countryside. She observes the plight of the urban poor, of rural workers displaced by industrialization, of mill workers, and of late 19th-century women who might wish for a better education and greater economic opportunity.

Having spent her life in the service of the sick, Evelyn Whitaker was familiar with sick rooms, hospitals and death, which often appear in her novels. Tip Cat (scarlet fever), Gay (diphtheria), and Lassie (typhoid) present descriptions of fever epidemics and public health and hygiene education. Gay provides details of home nursing care, quarantines and a visit to the London Fever Hospital at Homerton. Pen and Lassie include the effects of alcoholism on family life. Laddie and Lassie study gender differences in the care of aging parents.

Although the books were sometimes attributed to her, Evelyn Whitaker was not the author of Honor Bright, or the four leaved shamrock or of Gilly Flower (1889). A number of books by Whitaker's have been digitalised and made available on-line.

== Partial bibliography ==
Most of Whitaker's works appeared anonymously until 1903 (e. g. "by the author of Tip-Cat etc.") The earliest found UK editions are given. Bibliographical data are drawn from the British Library Main Catalogue and from a specialist bookseller's catalogue.

- 1878 Miss Toosey's Mission. A Tale (Mozley and Smith)
- 1879 Laddie (Walter Smith)
- 1884 Tip Cat (Walter Smith)
- 1885 Our Little Ann (?Walter Smith)
- 1889 Lil (A. D. Innes and Co.)
- 1885 Our Little Ann (Walter Smith)
- 1888 Pen (W. Smith and Innes)
- 1890 Zoë (W. and R. Chambers)
- 1891 Rose and Lavender (W. and R. Chambers)
- 1892 Pris. A Tale (A. D. Innes and Co.)
- 1892 Dear (A. D. Innes and Co.)
- 1892 Baby John (W. and R. Chambers)
- 1893 For the Fourth Time of Asking (?W. and R. Chambers)
- 1893 Pomona (W. and R. Chambers)
- 1895 My Honey (London: A. D. Innes)
- 1895 Don (W. and R. Chambers)
- 1898 Belle (W. and R. Chambers)
- 1898 Rob (W. and R. Chambers)
- 1900 Tom's Boy (W. and R. Chambers)
- 1901 Lassie (W. and R. Chambers)
- 1902 Faithful Boston: Little, Brown
- 1903 Gay. A Story (W. and R. Chambers)
- 1908 Baby Bob (W. and R. Chambers)
- 1920 Peter's Adventure, etc. (T. Nelson and Sons)
- 1920 Bee, Paul, and Babs, etc. (T. Nelson and Sons)
- 1928 The Tidy Wood. A Tale (T. Nelson and Sons)

== Illustrators ==
- Bee, Paul and Babs, colour frontispiece and 20 line drawings, T Nelson and Sons, 1920. Olive Allen Biller
- Pomona, 8 illustrations, W. and R. Chambers. R. Barnes
- Zoë, W. and R. Chambers, 1890. R. Barnes
- Rose and Lavender, 4 illustrations, W. and R. Chambers, c. 1910. Herbert A. Bone
- Laddie and Miss Toosey's Mission, frontispiece, Henry Altemus, no date. Walter Cooper Bradley
- Tip Cat, W. Smith, 1880. Randolph Caldecott. George Reiter Brill
- Tip Cat, copper engraving, W. Smith, 1880. J. D. Cooper
- My Honey, frontispiece, Ward Lock, 1910. Sidney Cowell
- Laddie (Editha Series), H. M. Caldwell, 1905. Eliot Keen
- Don, frontispiece and 8 illustrations, W. and R. Chambers, 1895. J. Finnemore
- Belle, 6 illustrations, W. and R. Chambers. G. Nicolet
- Laddie, frontispiece and 3 other black-and-white plates, E. P. Dutton, 1891. H. Winthrop Pierce
- Tom's Boy, 8 illustrations, W. and R. Chambers, 1900. Percy Tarrant (Margaret Tarrant's brother: Margaret illustrator of Ward and Lock's Fairy Tales, 48 plates, 1919 but may be a reissue)
- Gay, 6 illustrations, W. and R. Chambers. Percy Tarrant (Margaret Tarrant's brother)
- Gay: a story, Little, Brown, 1903. Percy Tarrant
- Zoë, Henry Altemus, 1899. W. H. Listern
- Lassie, frontis, W. and R. Chambers, no date. Jessie Wilson and W. Rainey
- Lassie, Little Brown, 1903. Jessie Wilson and W. Rainey
- Baby John, Zoë, For the Fourth Time of Asking, Little Brown, 1903. J. Harley
- Rob, Ward and Lock. J. Williamson
