= Herne Bay High School =

Herne Bay High Specialist School & Sports College

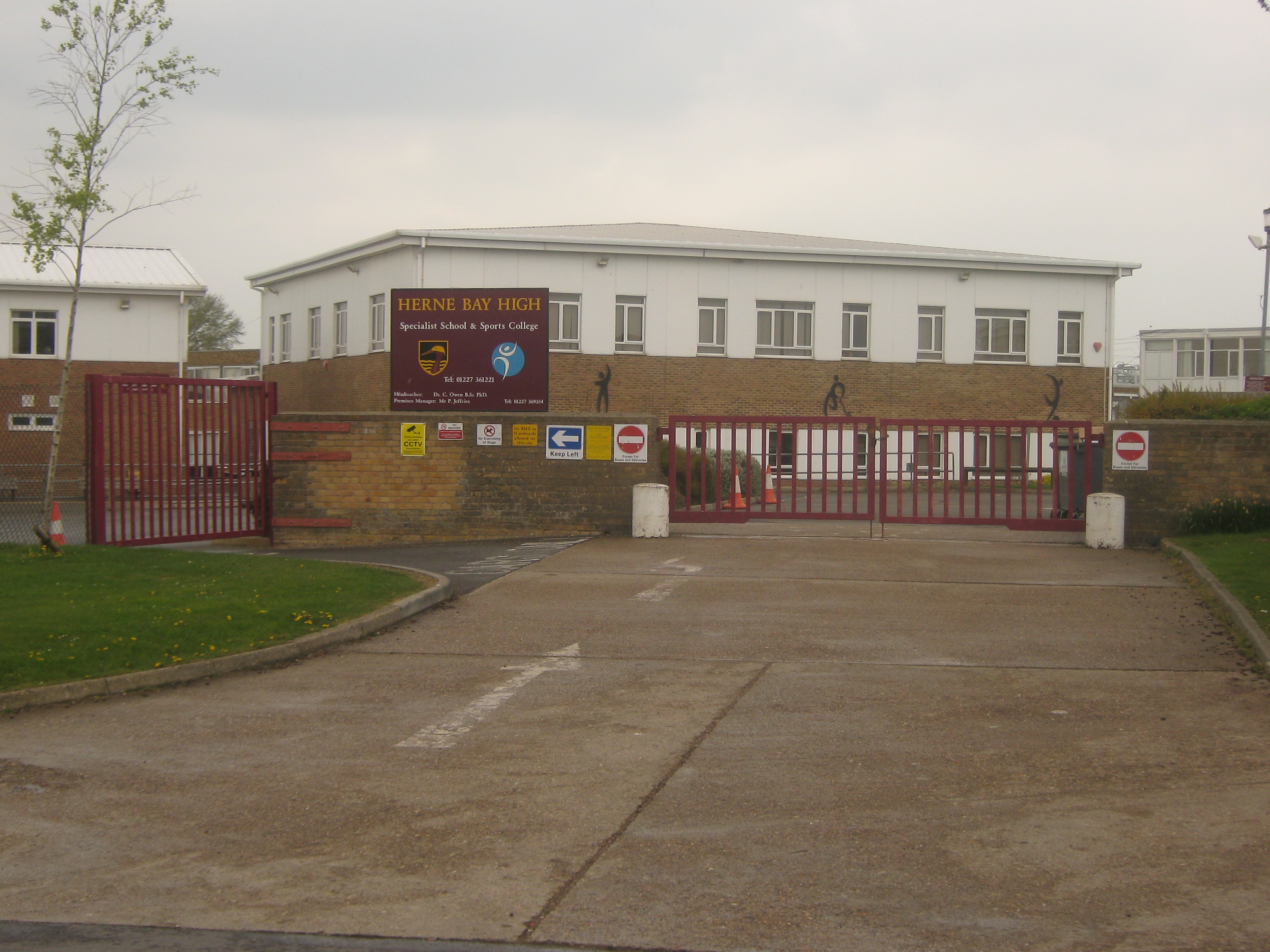
- Herne Bay High School in 2010

Location
- Bullockstone Road; Herne Bay, Kent, CT6 7NS; England; 51°21′42″N 1°06′45″E

Information
- Type: Academy
- Established: 1954
- Local authority: Kent County Council
- Department for Education URN: 136465 Tables
- Ofsted: Reports
- Principal: J. Boyes
- Gender: Coeducational
- Age: 11 to 18
- Enrolment: 1586
- Publication: The Heron
- Website: http://www.hernebayhigh.org/

Herne Bay High School is a mixed ability Academy, with designated Sports College status, situated in Herne Bay, Kent, England. There are 1506 students in the school aged 11 to 18. The principal as of September 2026 is Mr Christopher Simmons.

In September 2000, the school became a Foundation School and control passed from Kent County Council to the Board of Governors. Three years later, the school gained the status of a Specialist School and Sports College.

== History ==
The school was founded as Herne Bay County Secondary School, Bullockstone Road at Greenhill, Herne Bay. On 1 September 2000 the school became a Foundation school and control was passed from Kent County Council to the Board of Governors. Exactly three years later on 1 September 2003 the school became a Specialist school and Sports College. Year groups consist of year 7–13, (Years 12-13 is part of Sixth Form).

== School structure ==
The house system is known as a "College" and each house is named after letters of the Greek alphabet. These consist of: Delta, Epsilon, Omega, Sigma and Theta. Of which, each has its own head of college, mentor team, logo and coloured tie. Each house contains at least 260 students.

=== Lower school ===
As of 2014, the lower school has an annual intake of around 258 students at the start of Year Seven (age 11). The lower school (Years 7–11) is 1,285 students strong, for which the school uniform consists of a black blazer accompanied with the school badge on the breast pocket, with black trousers and a white shirt. Socks must be black and shoes must be plain. Shirts must be worn with a tie; which varies according to the mini-community in which the student is placed.

== Curriculum ==
As of 2014, the school follows the National Curriculum in Years 7–11 and offers a broad range of GCSEs (national exams taken by students aged 14–16) and A-levels (national exams taken by pupils aged 16–18).

The school year runs from September to July, split across three terms: the autumn term (September to December), spring term (January to April) and the summer term (April to July). Students receive two weeks off for Halloween, Christmas and Easter, a six-week summer break, and three "half term" breaks.

=== Examinations ===
As of 2010, the school offers GCSEs to students in the lower school, and AS/A-levels to students in the sixth form. League tables published by the BBC based on 2008 A-level results rank Herne Bay High as the sixty-second best school in Kent. According to the BBC, in 2009 A-Level students achieved an average of 658.2 QCDA points, against a national average of 739.1 and 44 per cent of students achieved five or more grade C results (or equivalent) at GCSE, including Maths and English.
