= Herne Bay =

Town in Kent, England

Coordinates: 51.37°N 1.13°E

- Town
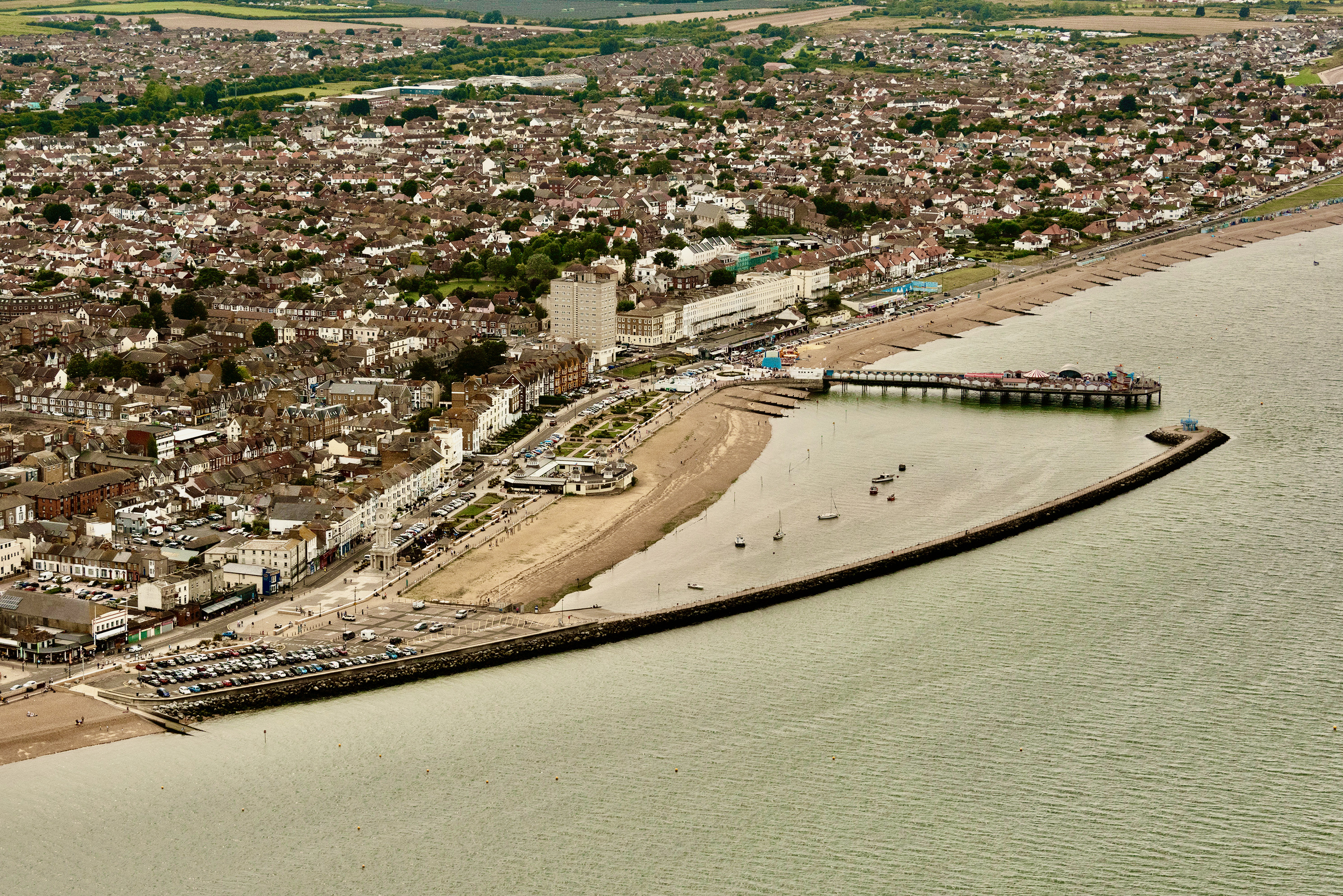
- Herne Bay, seafront

- Location within Kent
- Area: 10.79 km^{2} (4.17 sq mi)
- Population: 24,875 (2021)
  - Density: 2,305/km^{2} (5,970/sq mi)
- OS grid reference: TR177681
  - London: 67mi
- District: Canterbury
- Shire county: Kent
- Region: South East
- Country: England
- Sovereign state: United Kingdom
- Post town: HERNE BAY
- Postcode district: CT6
- Dialling code: 01227
- Police: Kent
- Fire: Kent
- Ambulance: South East Coast
- UK Parliament: Herne Bay and Sandwich

Herne Bay (/hɜːn/) is a seaside town on the north coast of Kent in South East England. It is 6 miles (10 km) north of Canterbury and 4 miles (6 km) east of Whitstable. It neighbours the ancient villages of Herne and Reculver and is part of the City of Canterbury local government district, although it remains a separate town with countryside between it and Canterbury. Herne Bay's seafront is home to the world's first freestanding purpose-built Clock Tower, built in 1837. From the late Victorian period until 1978, the town had the second-longest pier in the United Kingdom.

The town began as a small shipping community, receiving goods and passengers from London en route to Canterbury and Dover. The town rose to prominence as a seaside resort during the early 19th century after the building of a pleasure pier and promenade by a group of London investors, and reached its heyday in the late Victorian era. Its popularity as a holiday destination has declined over the past decades, due to the increase in foreign travel and to a lesser degree ,exposure to flooding that has prevented the town's redevelopment. In 2011 the town had a population of 38,563.

== History ==
The town of Herne Bay took its name from the neighbouring village of Herne, two kilometres inland from the bay. The word herne, meaning a place on a corner of land, evolved from the Old English hyrne, meaning corner. The village was first recorded in around 1100 as Hyrnan. The corner may relate to the sharp turn in the minor Roman road between Canterbury and Reculver at Herne.

One of the oldest buildings in Herne Bay is the late 18th-century inn The Ship, which served as the focal point for the small shipping and farming community that first inhabited the town. During this time, passenger and cargo boats regularly ran between Herne Bay and London and boats carrying coal ran from Newcastle. From Herne, there was easy access by road to the city of Canterbury.

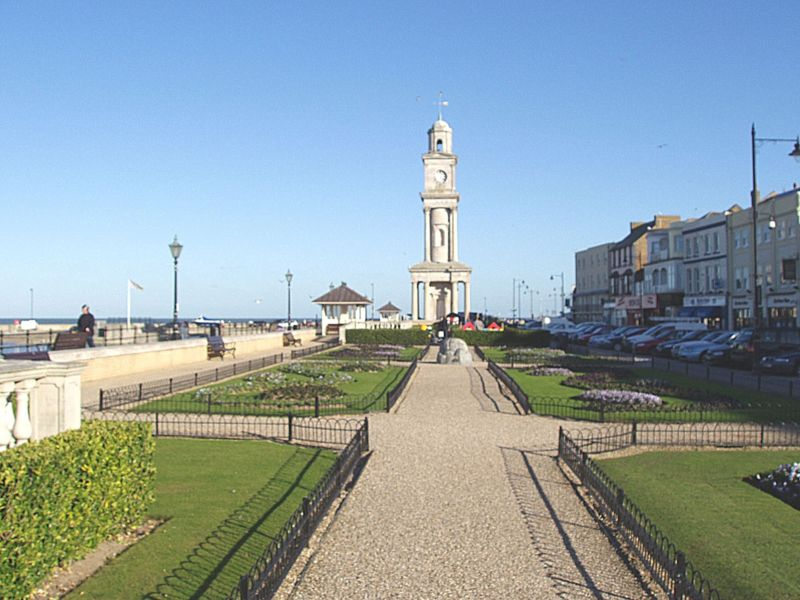
Clock Tower, Herne Bay

The 1801 census recorded Herne Bay, including Herne, as having a population of 1,232. During the early 19th century, a smugglers' gang operated from the town. The gang were regularly involved in a series of fights with the preventive services until finally being overpowered in the 1820s.

In the 1830s, a group of London investors, who recognised Herne Bay's potential as a seaside resort, built a wooden pier and a promenade on the town's seafront. This and the subsequent building of a railway station led to the rapid expansion of the town; between 1831 and 1841 the town's population grew from 1,876 to 3,041. The London businessmen intended to rename the town St Augustine's, but the name was unpopular with residents and the name "Herne Bay" remained. An act of Parliament, the Herne Parish Improvement Act 1833 (3 & 4 Vict. c. cv), established Herne Bay and Herne as separate towns. Local landowner Sir Henry Oxenden donated a piece of ground for the site of the town's first church, Christ Church, which was opened in 1834. In 1837, Mrs Ann Thwaytes, a wealthy widow from London, donated around £4,000 to build a 75 feet (23 m) clock tower on the town's seafront. It is believed to be the first freestanding, purpose-built clock tower in the world.

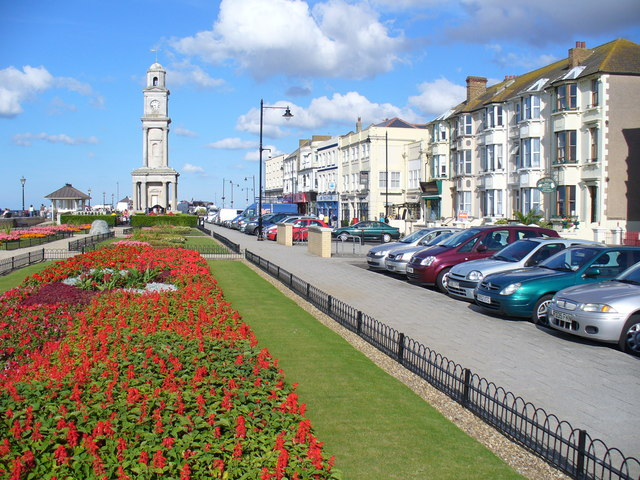
Tower Gardens

During the 1840s, steamboats began running between Herne Bay and London. There was a type of beach boat unique to Herne Bay and nearby Thanet, known as the Thanet wherry, a narrow pulling boat about 18 feet (5 m) long. These boats were mainly used for fishing; however, with the advent of tourism and the decline of fishing, they became mainly used for pleasure trips. A document dated 1840 records the town as having the following schools, all of which are now defunct: Haddington (boarding school), Oxenden House, The British School, Prospect Place and Herne Street School. The village of Herne was often called Herne Street around this time. The same document also mentions the still-existing Rodney Head, The Ship and Upper Red Lion inns.

In 1912, the first "Brides in the Bath" murder by George Joseph Smith was committed in Herne Bay. BBC scriptwriter Anthony Coburn, who lived in the resort, was one of the people who conceived the idea of a police box as a time machine for Doctor Who. During World War II, a sea-fort was built off the coast of Herne Bay and Whitstable, which is still in existence. The coastal village of Reculver, to the east of Herne Bay, was the site of the testing of the bouncing bomb used by the "Dam Busters" during the war.

=== The pier ===
The original wooden pier had to be dismantled in 1871 after its owners went into liquidation and sea worms had damaged the wood. A shorter 100 metres (328 ft)-long iron pier with a theatre and shops at the entrance was built in 1873.

However, it was too short for steamboats to berth at. The pier proved to be unprofitable and in 1896 construction began on a replacement iron pier which would be longer and feature an electric tram. At 3,600 feet (1,097 m), this pier was the second longest in the country, behind only the pier at Southend-on-Sea.

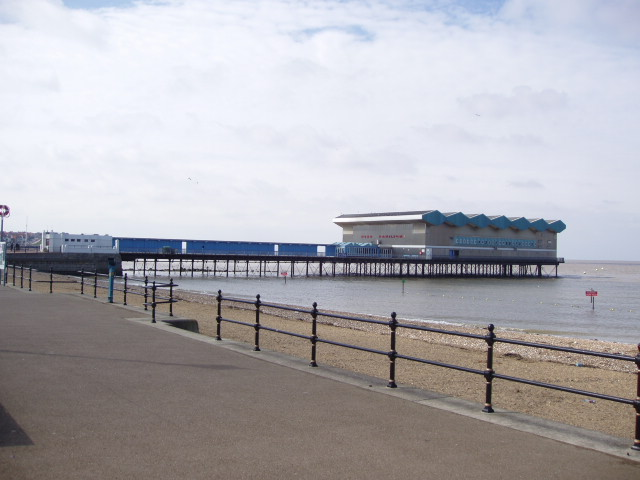
The landward end of Herne Bay pier

The town's heyday as a seaside resort was during the late Victorian era; the population nearly doubled from 4,410 to 8,442 between 1881 and 1901. Much of the resulting late Victorian seafront architecture is still in existence today. In 1910, a pavilion was added to the landward end of the pier. By 1931, the town's population had grown to 14,533. At the beginning of World War II, the army cut two gaps between the landward end of the pier and the seaward terminal as a counter-invasion measure. The pier's two gaps were bridged for pedestrians after the war.

1963 marked the end of steamboat services from the pier. In 1970, a fire destroyed the pier's pavilion, and plans were made to replace it with a sports centre, which was opened in 1976 by former Prime Minister Edward Heath. The centre section of the pier was torn down by a storm in 1978, leaving the end of the pier isolated in the sea. It has not been rebuilt due to the cost; however, residents and businesses in the town have campaigned for its restoration. The sports centre was demolished in 2012, leaving a bare platform.

== Governance ==
Sir Roger James Gale (born 20 August 1943) is a British Conservative Party politician who has served as Member of Parliament (MP) for Herne Bay and Sandwich, previously North Thanet, since 1983.

Herne Bay, along with Whitstable and Canterbury, is in the City of Canterbury local government district, although it remains a separate town, with countryside between it and Canterbury. The town contains the five electoral wards of Heron, Herne and Broomfield, Greenhill and Eddington, West Bay and Reculver. These wards have thirteen of the fifty seats on the Canterbury City council. As at the 2011 local elections, twelve of those seats were held by the Conservatives and one by the Liberal Democrats.

== Geography ==
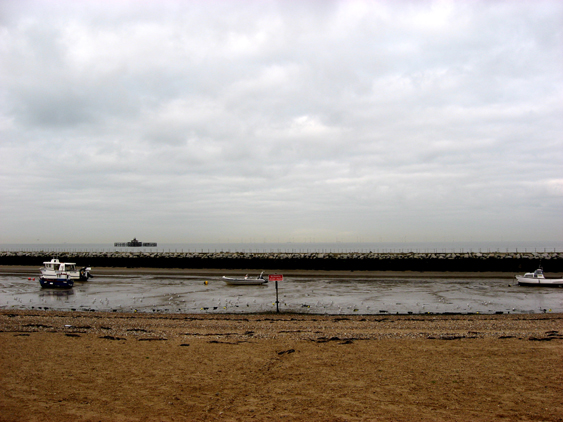
The coast in Herne Bay, showing a few boats in the mud after the tide went out.

Herne Bay is in north-east Kent, on the coast of the Thames Estuary. The town is situated 4.5 miles (7.2 km) east of Whitstable and 6.6 miles (10.6 km) north-north-east of the city of Canterbury. The village of Herne is about 1.5 miles (2.4 km) to the south and the village of Reculver is about 3 miles (4.8 km) to the east. The town's suburbs are Hampton, Greenhill and Studd Hill in the west, Eddington and Broomfield in the south, with Beltinge and Hillborough in the east. The drowned settlement of Hampton-on-Sea once existed beside what is now Hampton.

The landscape of the town has been largely influenced by the Plenty Brook, which flows northward through the centre of the town and into the North Sea. It is thought to have been a much larger stream in ancient times. The coastline has two distinct bays, separated by a jut of land created by silt from the outflow of the brook into the sea. The first buildings in the town were built along the east bay, a short distance from the brook outflow, where the road from Canterbury met the sea. The town has since spread across both bays, across the Plenty Brook valley and onto the relatively high land flanking both sides of the valley. The land to the east of the valley reaches a height of 25 metres (82 ft) above sea level and to the west reaches 10 metres (33 ft). Cliffs are formed where this high land meets the sea.

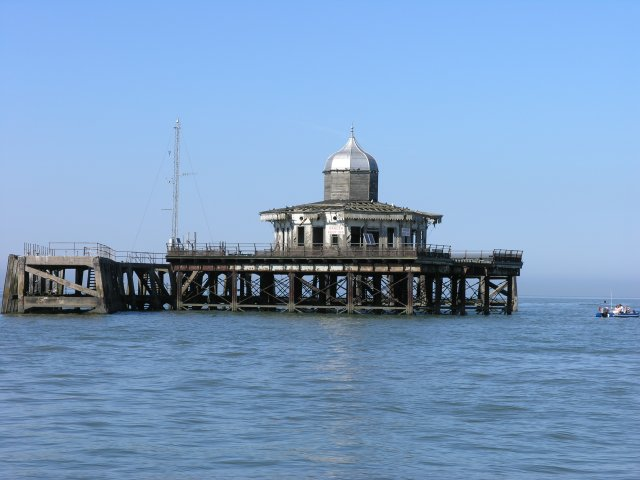
The seaward end of Herne Bay pier, now isolated out at sea

The rising land beside the coast, between the valley and the eastern cliffs, is known as The Downs (with no relation to the North or South Downs). This area has been named a Site of Scientific Interest and a Special Protection Area for birds. The whole of the north-east Kent coast has been designated a Site of Special Scientific Interest. The geology of the town consists mainly of London Clay, overlaid with brickearth in the west. The sand and clay of The Downs are subject to landslips.

The Plenty Brook passes through the town's drainage system, allowing buildings to be built over the top. The brook has been prone to flooding during heavy rain, especially in inland areas, which regularly causes problems for people living in the Eddington area in southern Herne Bay.

Stormy weather can cause the sea level by the coast to rise by up to two metres. In the past, this has caused disastrous flooding in the town; the worst in the town's history being in 1953. Coastal defences were subsequently constructed, including groynes, sea walls and shingle beach. In the 1990s, these defences were deemed to be inadequate and an offshore breakwater, now known as Neptune's Arm, was built to protect the most vulnerable areas of the town.

== Climate ==
Herne Bay experiences an oceanic climate (Köppen climate classification Cfb).

The nearest Met Office station is at Manston, 10 miles east.

In east Kent, the warmest time of the year is July and August, when maximum temperatures average around 21 °C (70 °F); the coolest months are January and February, when minimum temperatures average around 1 °C (34 °F). East Kent's average maximum and minimum temperatures are around 1/2 °C higher than the national average. Herne Bay is sometimes warmer than other parts of Kent as it is backed by the North Downs to the south, causing a Foehn effect when winds are from a south or south westerly direction. Between 1999 and 2005, Herne Bay recorded the highest daily temperature in the United Kingdom nine times. East Kent's average annual rainfall is about 728 mm (29 inches), the wettest months being October to January. This was lower than the national average annual rainfall of 838 mm (33 inches), and recent droughts have led to hosepipe bans by Mid Kent Water.

The highest temperature recorded in Herne Bay was in August 2003 when the temperature hit 36.5 °C (97.7 °F) during the 2003 European heatwave and the lowest temperature being in January 1940 with 8 °F (−13 °C) recorded during a notably cold winter that affected the UK.

== Demography ==
Herne Bay population comparison (2001 UK census)
	Herne Bay	Canterbury District	England
Total population	35,188	135,278	49,138,831
Foreign-born	3.7%	5.1%	9.2%
White	99%	97%	91%
Asian	0.7%	1.6%	4.6%
Black	0.2%	0.5%	2.3%
Christian	77%	73%	72%
Muslim	0.3%	0.6%	3.1%
Hindu	0.2%	0.4%	1.1%
No religion	14%	17%	15%
Over 65 years old	22%	19%	16%
Unemployed	2.9%	2.7%	3.3%

As of the 2001 UK census, Herne Bay area wards had a population of 35,188 and a population density of 11.3 persons per hectare.

Of the town's 14,732 households, 48.7% were married couples living together, 8.4% were cohabiting couples and 8.3% were lone parents. 30.2% of all households were made up of individuals, and 20.5% had someone living alone at pensionable age. 27.7% of households included children aged under 16 or a person aged 16 to 18 who was in full-time education. The average household size was 2.74.

The ethnicity of the town was 98.5% white, 0.6% mixed race, 0.4% Asian, 0.2% black and 0.3% Chinese or other. The place of birth of residents was 96.3% United Kingdom, 0.6% Republic of Ireland, 0.3% Germany, 0.6% other Western Europe countries, 0.2% Eastern Europe, 0.6% Africa, 0.3% Far East, 0.3% South Asia, 0.2% Middle East, 0.2% North America and 0.2% Oceania. Religion was recorded as 77.3% Christian, 0.3% Muslim, 0.2% Hindu, 0.2% Buddhist, 0.1% Jewish and 0.1% Sikh. 14.2% were recorded as having no religion, 0.3% had an alternative religion and 7.4% did not state their religion.

For every 100 females, there were 89.9 males. The age distribution was 6% aged 0–4 years, 14% aged 5–15 years, 4% aged 16–19 years, 29% aged 20–44 years, 25% aged 45–64 years and 22% aged 65 years and over. The town had a high percentage of residents over 65, compared with the national average of 16%. As a seaside town, Herne Bay is a popular retirement destination; many modern retirement complexes are located near the seafront.

The economic activity of residents aged 16–74 was 36% in full-time employment, 13% in part-time employment, 9% self-employed, 3% unemployed, 2% students with jobs, 3% students without jobs, 18% retired, 7% looking after home or family, 6% permanently sick or disabled and 2% economically inactive for other reasons. This was roughly in line with the national figures, except for the number of people in retirement. This figure nationally was significantly lower at 14%. Of the town's residents aged 16–74, 12% had a higher education qualification or the equivalent, compared with 20% nationwide. According to Office for National Statistics estimates, during the period of April 2001 to March 2002 the average gross weekly income of households in the Herne Bay area was £516 (£26,906 per year).

== Economy ==
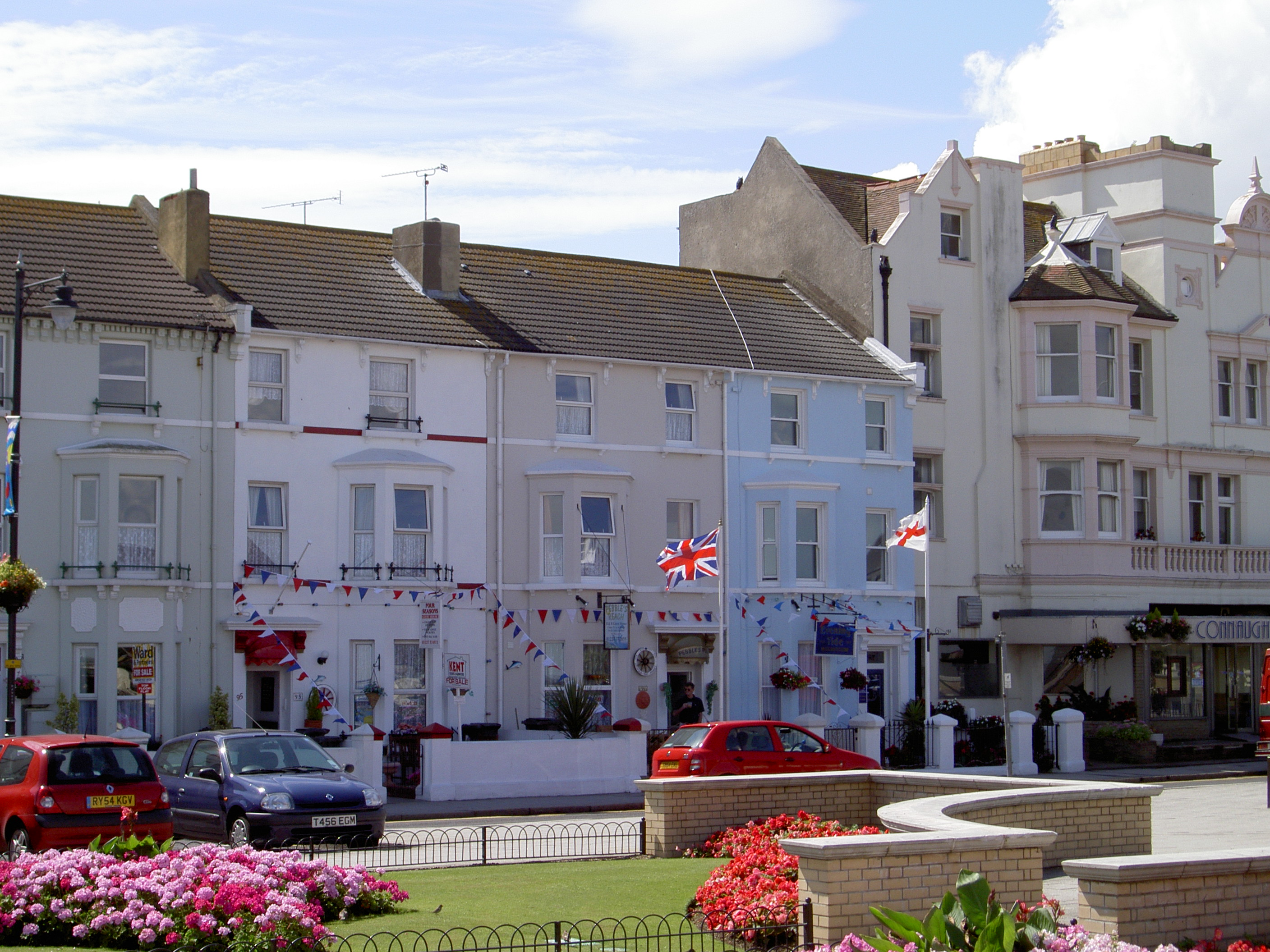
Guest houses on Herne Bay seafront

The advent of overseas travel and changes to holiday trends eventually caused the town's economy to decline after the 1960s; regular flooding of the Plenty Brook prevented redevelopment of the town centre. However, extensive seafront regeneration in the 1990s followed the creation of the Neptune's Arm sea defence jetty. The jetty has created a small harbour used by leisure boats and from where tourists can take sailing yacht trips to a seal-watching site in the Thames estuary. The Victorian gardens on the seafront were then able to be fully restored. The Central Bandstand, built in 1924, was refurbished after years of disrepair and closure to the public. A swimming pool and cinema were added to the town centre in the early 1990s. In 2005, a wind-farm with thirty 2.75 MW wind turbines was built 5 miles (8 km) off the coast of Herne Bay and Whitstable, generating a total of 82.5 MW of electricity. The recent upgrades by the Council have helped improve the image of the town and raise its profile. It is hoped this will attract new investment in tourism and business by the private sector, and lead to the regeneration of the town's economy.

In 2006, Canterbury City Council began a public consultation to discuss the regeneration. A concern raised by the council is that the shopping centre is incoherent and fails to attract the tourists who come for the seafront. Other issues raised are the lack of holiday accommodation, car parks and clear pedestrian routes between the three main attractions in the town: the seafront, Memorial park and shopping centre. The council is considering relocating the sports centre from the pier and replacing it with other tourist attractions.

As of the 2001 census, the industry of employment of residents of Herne Bay was 19% retail, 14% health and social work, 11% manufacturing, 10% construction, 9% real estate, 8% education, 8% transport and communications, 5% public administration, 5% hotels and restaurants, 4% finance, 1% agriculture and 5% other community, social or Personal Services. Compared to national figures, the town had a relatively high number of workers in the construction and health/social care industries and a relatively low number in manufacturing and real estate. Many residents commute to work outside the town. As of the 2001 UK census, 14,711 of the town's residents were in employment, whereas there were only 8,104 jobs within the town.

One of the largest employers is the centrally located supermarket, which as of January 2006 was considering further expansion. It is one of the major attractions to the town's shopping centre, however there are fears that its expansion could lead it to become too dominant, at the cost of smaller shops in the town. Apart from tourism and retail, many jobs are also provided in the manufacturing industry, mainly located in industrial estates on the outskirts of the town, which produce goods such as kitchen furniture and factory machinery. A high number of construction jobs have been created by redevelopment of the seafront, which is expected to continue with the proposed regeneration of the town centre. The elderly population of the town has led to many Health and Social Care jobs at local care homes and at the town's Queen Victoria Memorial Hospital. As of the 2001 census, 1.9% of the town's population resided in a medical or care establishment, compared with the national average of only 0.8%.

== Landmarks ==
The seafront has a 2 miles (3 km) shingle beach, which has been awarded a European Blue Flag and the yellow and blue Seaside Award for its safety and cleanliness. The seafront features a Victorian bandstand and gardens, amusement arcades, and children's play areas. Landmarks by the seafront include the Clock Tower, the sea defence jetty, the off-shore World War II sea fort and the off-shore wind farm. There are seaside cafés, fresh seafood restaurants, guesthouses, beach huts and numerous water-sports facilities.

The Memorial Park, situated near the centre of the town, incorporates a children's play area, a large shallow duck pond often used for remote control boats, basketball and tennis courts and a large expanse of grass for field games. The park has a monument and an 'Avenue of Remembrance' as memorials to the town's residents killed during the two world wars.

Reculver Country Park is about 3 miles (4.8 km) east of Herne Bay, and is home to the cliff-top remains of St Mary's Church, Reculver, with its distinctive twin towers, sited within the remains of a Roman fort; a visitor centre offers information on the local geology, history and wildlife. Wildwood Discovery Park is about 2.7 miles (4.3 km) south of Herne Bay on the A291 road between there and Sturry, and features over 50 species of native British animals, such as deer, badgers, wild boar and wolves.

Herne Mill, a late 18th-century Kentish smock mill overlooking the village of Herne from a hilltop, is usually open to visitors on Sunday afternoons between April and September. A concrete funnel-shaped water tower overlooks Herne Bay from the top of Mickleburgh Hill. This water tower is now used as a base for radio transmitters.

== Transport ==
North-East Kent

Herne Bay railway station is on the Chatham Main Line, which runs between Ramsgate in East Kent and London Victoria. It is also served by Southeastern high speed services to London St Pancras. Other stations on these lines include Broadstairs, Margate, Whitstable, Faversham, Gillingham, Rochester, Bromley South, Gravesend and Stratford International. Herne Bay is around 1 hour and 40 minutes from London Victoria and 80 minutes from St Pancras. A selection of trains run to London's Cannon Street and London Blackfriars, primarily for business commuting.

There are Stagecoach South East bus services (Triangle/6/36) running to neighbouring Whitstable and to Canterbury, where many Herne Bay residents go to work and shop. The 36 bus route runs to Margate, another popular seaside resort There is also an infrequent bus service 7 , which formerly linked Herne Bay to Canterbury, but Triangle/6 routes were more frequent, quick and direct; as a result, the 7 was shortened significantly in June 2022.

The A299 road, also known as the Thanet Way, runs between Ramsgate and Faversham via Herne Bay and Whitstable. The road merges with the M2 motorway at Faversham. In the late 1990s, the road was converted into a dual carriageway and redirected to avoid passing through urban areas of Herne Bay and Whitstable.

== Education ==
Herne Bay's secondary school is the modern Herne Bay High. It is a mixed ability foundation school with about 1,500 students. In 2002, Herne Bay High was designated a specialist school and Sports College. In 2005, 14% of the school's pupils gained at least five GCSEs at grades A*–C including English and maths, ranking it 107th out of Kent's 120 secondary schools. Many students commute to schools in other nearby towns, especially to the grammar schools in Faversham, Ramsgate and Canterbury.

Herne Bay Junior School, situated in the town centre, has about 500 students. It was originally established in the late Victorian era and was formerly joined with the neighbouring Herne Bay Infant school. In 2006, Herne Bay Junior School's Key Stage 2 results ranked 139th out of Kent's 386 state primary schools.

The village schools are Herne Primary School, Herne Church of England Junior School, Herne Church of England Infant and Nursery School, Thornden Wood Primary School in Greenhill, Hampton Primary School and Reculver Church of England Primary School. The Church of England schools are voluntary controlled (that is, owned by the church) but, like the other schools, are run by Kent County Council. In 2006, Reculver Church of England Primary School achieved the best Key Stage 2 performances of the schools in the Herne Bay area, ranking 133rd out of Kent's 386 state primary schools.

Canterbury College @ Herne Bay is a branch of Canterbury College in Herne Bay town centre, which provides a range of short information technology courses to adults. Whitstable Adult education Centre runs adult learning courses at various Herne Bay locations.

== Religion ==
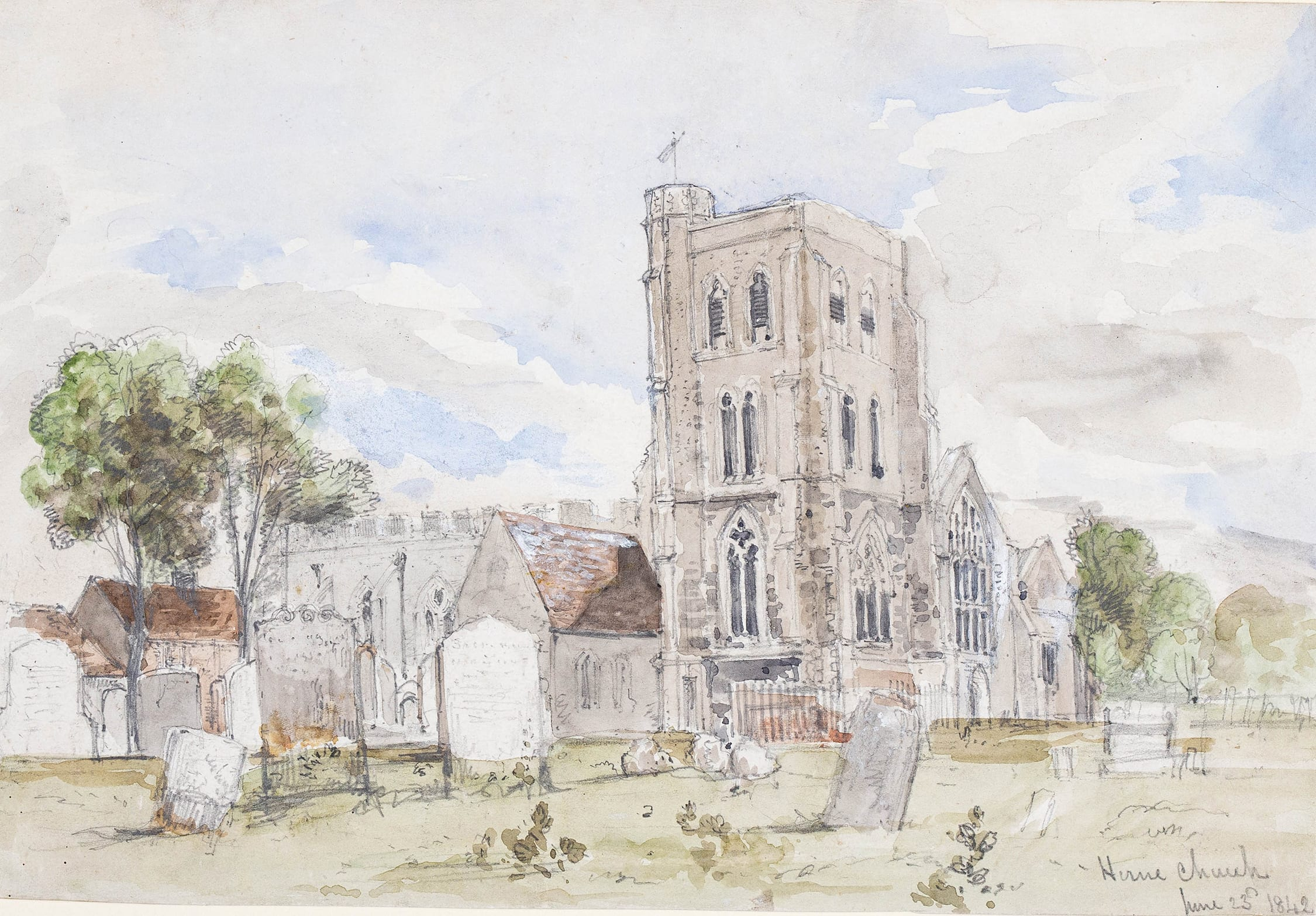
St. Martin's, in an anonymous painting dated 23 June 1842

The Church of England has two parishes in Herne Bay: Christ Church with St Andrew's, and St Martin's with St Peter's. The Catholic Church of Our Lady of the Sacred Heart is in Clarence Road. There is a Baptist church in the High Street. There is a United (Methodist and United Reformed) Church in Mortimer Street. There is also a United Reformed Church in The Meadows, Broomfield. Herne Bay Salvation Army Corps is based in Richmond Street. The Canopy Church is in South Road. The Beacon Church meets at Thornden Wood Primary School, Greenhill, Herne Bay. Herne Bay Evangelical Free Church meets in Sunnyhill Road. Herne Bay Christian Spiritualist Church is in Avenue Road.

== Culture ==
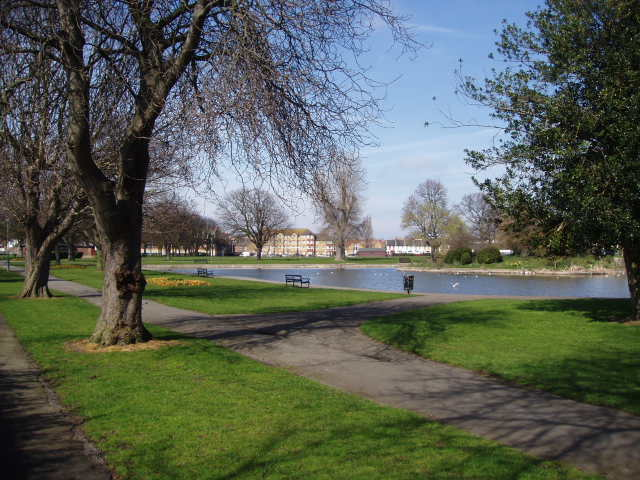
Herne Bay Memorial Park

Herne Bay Festival happens every August with ten days of almost every event being free, including live music, performance, creative commissions, cultural treats, family fun, workshops, competitions, walks, talks, exhibitions and family entertainment.

Other summer events include Happy Days, a programme of bandstand concerts and family entertainment, Herne Bay Carnival through the town centre, a travelling funfair at the Memorial Park and Herne Bay Bus Rally. Each summer, the council runs a gardening competition, "Herne Bay in Bloom", which encourages residents and businesses to keep the town looking well presented.

The town is home to the Herne Bay Little Theatre, a playmakers drama society and member of the Little Theatre Guild of Great Britain who have a 72-seat theatre in Bullers Avenue. In 2007, the theatre won a large grant from the Big Lottery Fund to renovate and extend their building and provide improved disabled access. The theatre also has an active youth theatre and between them, they put on at least eight productions every year including a pantomime. Theatrecraft, a local theatre group, produce three shows a year including an annual pantomime at the King's Hall theatre. Other groups and touring companies often put productions on at the open-air 'Theatre in the Park' on the grounds of Strode Park House in Herne. Between the 1960s and the 1990s The Herne Bay Operatic Society contributed to the town and its cultural life, performing regularly at The King's Hall and also at The Marlowe Theatre, Canterbury. As theatrical tastes changed the society morphed into The Herne Bay Musical Theatre Society.

The town's only cinema, the Kavanagh, is part of a Greco-inspired building that incorporates the Heron's swimming pool and the council offices.

== Sport ==
The town is a popular destination for water sports; it has clubs for sailing, rowing and yachting. The town has hosted the Zapcat powerboat racing championships. Fishing is popular on the pier and Herne Bay Angling Association competes nationally in beach and boat fishing competitions.

Herne Bay Hockey Club, Greenhill Gymnastics Club, Herne Bay Cricket Club and Herne Bay Youth Football Club are located at Herne Bay High School, a specialist sports college, and also the new sports arena called The Hub. The hockey club runs a ladies' team and five men's team, the highest of which plays in the Kent Sussex Regional 1st XI League. Herne Bay Cricket Club runs two junior teams, a men's Sunday team and two men's Saturday teams; the Saturday teams play in the Kent Cricket Feeder League East.

Herne Bay Tennis Club is situated on the outskirts of town and runs multiple teams in the Kent League, East Kent League and Dover & District League. Their facilities include four all-weather courts (two floodlit), up to six astroturf courts and a purpose-built clubhouse. The club offers junior coaching and runs regular club nights for players of all ages and abilities.

Herne Bay Basketball Club has teams for men, women and juniors in the East Kent Basketball League. Herne Bay Golf Club has an eighteen-hole course on the outskirts of the town. The Memorial Park contains a sports field, eight tennis courts and a basketball court which can be used free of charge. Herne Bay Bowling Club is situated next to the Memorial Park and hosts several lawn bowls Open Tournaments each year.

There is a council owned sports centre, The Bay Sports Arena, which opened in September 2011. There is another privately owned gymnasium in the town centre. Herne Bay Judo Club is located near the railway station and the same venue also holds clubs for table tennis and badminton; there are also two other table-tennis clubs in the town. Bujinkai karate classes are held at Herne Bay Junior School.

Herne Bay Football Club, based at Winch's Field, play in the Isthmian League Division One South. They were Kent League champions in 1992, 1994, 1997, 1998 and 2012.

The town is the founder of the Roller Hockey sport with the Herne Bay Roller Hockey club being the first to exist in the world.

Herne Bay Judo Club, located next to the town's railway station, has been active in the town since the 1960s. The club originated underneath the old St Mary's college on station road until it moved into the purpose-built dojo where it still resides.

== Media ==
Local news and television programmes are provided by BBC South East and ITV Meridian. Television signals are received from either the Bluebell Hill or Dover TV transmitters.

There are four local weekly newspapers: YourCanterbury, the paid-for Herne Bay Gazette, providing news related only to the town, and the free KM Extra and Canterbury Adscene, providing news on the wider Canterbury district area. The KM Group owns Herne Bay Gazette and KM Extra, while Trinity Mirror owns Canterbury Adscene.

Local radio stations are BBC Radio Kent on 104.2 FM, Heart South on 102.8 FM, Gold on 603 AM and KMFM Canterbury is a radio station on frequency 106FM which serves Canterbury, Whitstable and Herne Bay. The station was founded in September 1997 as CTFM, but was rebranded after a takeover by the KM Group. Cabin FM is the town's radio station aimed at Herne Bay listeners. It broadcasts 24 hours a day, 7 days a week, to the town and surrounding villages on 94.6 FM and around the world on the Internet. On 15 June 2016, OFCOM announced that Cabin had been successful in their bid to obtain a Community Radio Licence. They began broadcasting on FM in April 2017.

== In popular culture ==
Due to the town's traditional seaside appearance, Herne Bay has often been used as a setting for television programmes and films. The seafront has been featured in programmes such as the 1968 Doctor Who serial Fury from the Deep, ITV period drama Upstairs, Downstairs, the 1984 BBC seaside comedy Cockles, CBBC's The Tweenies, the BBC comedy Little Britain, and the ITV miniseries Joan. The town's railway station was seen in an episode of the 1970s comedy Some Mothers Do 'Ave 'Em. The town has featured in films such as Ken Russell's French Dressing, and The Medusa Touch, starring Richard Burton. In fiction, Jeeves from the stories by P. G. Wodehouse regularly holidays at the town, spending much of his time there fishing.

To celebrate Anthony Coburn's contribution to the Doctor Who series, BBC South East celebrated 50 years of Doctor Who by screening the first ever episode An Unearthly Child, at the Kings Hall theatre on 22 November 2013. The outdoor scenes in the ITV1 comedy Kate & Koji were filmed on the town's seafront.

== Twin towns ==
Herne Bay is twinned with the towns of:

- Wimereux in Pas-de-Calais, France;
- Waltrop, Germany.

Since 1994, the Herne Bay/Wimereux Twinning Association has aimed to promote friendship between the people of the two towns by organising activities, such as cycling trips and quiz evenings. Herne Bay and Waltrop have been twinned since 1976, although as at February 2007, their twinning association was not in operation. However, Herne Bay Rowing club promote friendship with the Waltrop rowing club by organising rowing events and visiting in each other's towns.

== Notable people ==
The actor and presenter Bob Holness lived in the town as a child and attended Herne Bay Primary School until moving to Ashford. Nicki Chapman, the judge on the UK television series Popstars and Pop Idol, was born and raised in the town. Originally from London, Daniel Tammet, the subject of the UK documentary The Boy with the Incredible Brain, has now moved to the town. He is an autistic savant with outstanding abilities in mathematics, sequence memorising and language learning. Lydia Cecilia Hill (1913–1940), known as Cissie Hill, lived at Westcliff; she was a favourite of Ibrahim of Johor and former dancer. The Yorkshire-born writer Will Scott lived and wrote in Herne Bay until his death in 1964.

During the late 1960s, many rock and jazz bands were formed around the city of Canterbury, creating a subgenre of music known as the Canterbury sound. Some of these musicians were residents of Herne Bay, including Dave Sinclair and Richard Coughlan of Caravan, and Kevin Ayers of Soft Machine. George W. M. Reynolds, one of the most popular British authors of the early Victorian era, moved to Herne Bay in 1854 and became one of the town's Improvement Commissioners. The children's writer Evelyn Whitaker was born there in 1844. Héctor García Ribeyro, the Mayor of Lima in Peru during the 1950s, had part of his schooling at the now defunct Herne Bay International school. Colin Dixon, the depot manager held hostage with his family during the £53 million Securitas depot robbery of February 2006, lived in Herne Bay at the time.

Frederick Christian Palmer, known professionally as Fred C. Palmer, was the main public photographer of Herne Bay in the early years of the 20th century. He photographed the detective Edmund Reid, who had hunted for Jack the Ripper and who also lived in the town. Ann Thwaytes paid for the construction of the Clock Tower. F. W. J. Palmer, Surveyor to Herne Bay Urban District Council 1891–1915, designed both phases of The King's Hall in 1904 and 1913. Gabrielle Davis was Sheriff of Canterbury 2009–2010 and helped to save local museums from closure in 2010. William Matthew Scott (1893–1964) was a local author living at High View Avenue, and architect Ernest Trevor Spashett lived next door to him between 1959 and 1965. William Sidney Cooper painted local scenes and is buried at Eddington cemetery. H. Kempton Dyson designed the Central Bandstand. Tom Armstrong Bowes (1869–1964), a physician and antiquarian, and Harold Eric Gough, a librarian, museum curator and writer, were Herne Bay historians who lectured on the subject and co-founded Herne Bay Historical Records Society (HBHRS) and Herne Bay Museum and Gallery. Rev. Canon Thomas Benjamin Watkins founded St John's Church, Dortmund Square (built 1899, demolished 1983), and was vicar of Christ Church and St John's Church.

== See also ==
- Herne Bay Museum and Gallery

== Bibliography ==
- Bundock, M., Victorian Herne Bay: Herne Bay Past Series 6 (Herne Bay Historical Records Society, 1 February 2011) ISBN 978-1-904661-16-0
- Bundock, M., Thesis: Herne Bay 1830 – 1880: a failed seaside resort? (undated). Note: Mike Bundock (1961–2022) was a published historian and chairman of Herne Bay Historical Records Society 2016–2022.
- Gough, H., Herne Bay's Piers: Herne Bay Past Series 1 (HBHRS, October 2008) ISBN 978-1-904661-07-8
- Gough, H., Mills and Milling in the Herne Bay Area: Herne Bay Past Series 3 (HBHRS, April 2010) ISBN 978-1-904661-13-9
- Fishpool, J., A Town at War: Herne Bay in the Second World War: Herne Bay Past Series 5 (HBHRS, 3 December 2010) ISBN 1-904661-15-7
- Fishpool, J., Herne Bay's Hotels and Public Houses: Herne Bay Past Series 2 (HBHRS, August 2009) ISBN 978-1-904661-08-5
- Fishpool, J., Schools and Colleges in the Herne Bay Area: Herne Bay Past Series 4 (HBHRS, August 2010) ISBN 978-1-904661-14-6
- Gough, H. and Fishpool, J., Smuggling in and Around Herne Bay: Herne Bay Past Series 7 (HBHRS, October 2011) ISBN 978-1-904661-17-7
