= Abram Newman =

English businesspeople (1736–1799)

Abram (or Abraham) Newman (1736–1799) was one of the wealthiest men in 18th century London. He spent his life as a partner in one of the leading grocers, importing a wide range of produce including tea, coffee, sugar and spices.

== Life ==
Abram was born at Mount Bures in Essex in 1736, the son of Thomas Newman of Mount Hall in the same parish and his wife, Anne, the daughter of Hugh Constable of Bures St Mary. Through his mother, Abram was the first cousin of Golding Constable of East Bergholt in Suffolk, the father of the artist, John Constable. Through his father, Abram was a descendant of Colonel Richard Newman, who assisted King Charles II in his flight from the Battle of Worcester.

Abram went to the City of London and entered the business world as a grocer. On 12 June 1759, he married Mary (1720–1783), the sister of Monkhouse Davison, a partner in the firm of Rawlinson and Davison, "dealers in coffee, tea, chocolate, snuff, etc" of Creechurch Lane. Two years later, he was made a freeman of the Grocer's Company and, in 1764, he joined his brother-in-law's company as a third partner.

Five years later, the senior partner, Thomas Rawlinson (not to be confused with his great-uncle Sir Thomas Rawlinson, Lord Mayor in 1706), died and the company became known as Davison, Newman and Co., the name under which it still operates today. In 1774, chests of tea from Newman's company were amongst those thrown into Boston Harbour during the Boston Tea Party which started the American Revolution. The company sought compensation from George III for £480 for the loss of the tea.

In 1790, Newman purchased the manor of Mount Bures. Davison died three years later. Newman retired shortly afterwards and followed him to the grave on 8 March 1799 at his house in Fenchurch Street.

"He was one of the richest citizens of London, and a happy instance of the wonderful powers of accumulation by the steady pursuit of honourable industry. Without speculation or adventure he acquired £600,000 as a grocer. He retired from trade about four years ago [1795], but so forcible was his habit that he came every day to the shop, and ate his mutton chop at 2 o'clock (the good old city hour) with his successors...." (See Dinner#Ancient.)

Newman had no sons, and his heirs were his two daughters, Anne, wife of George Caswell, and Jane, wife of William Thoyts of Sulhamstead Abbots in Berkshire. Davison, Newman and his wife were buried together in All Hallows Staining. After the collapse of the crypt there, their monument was to be seen in the church of St Olave Hart Street, London until it suffered bomb damage in May 1941 during the Second World War.

== See also ==
- Monkhouse Davison gives a more detailed account of the business
