= Ann Thwaytes =

English philanthropist (1789–1866)

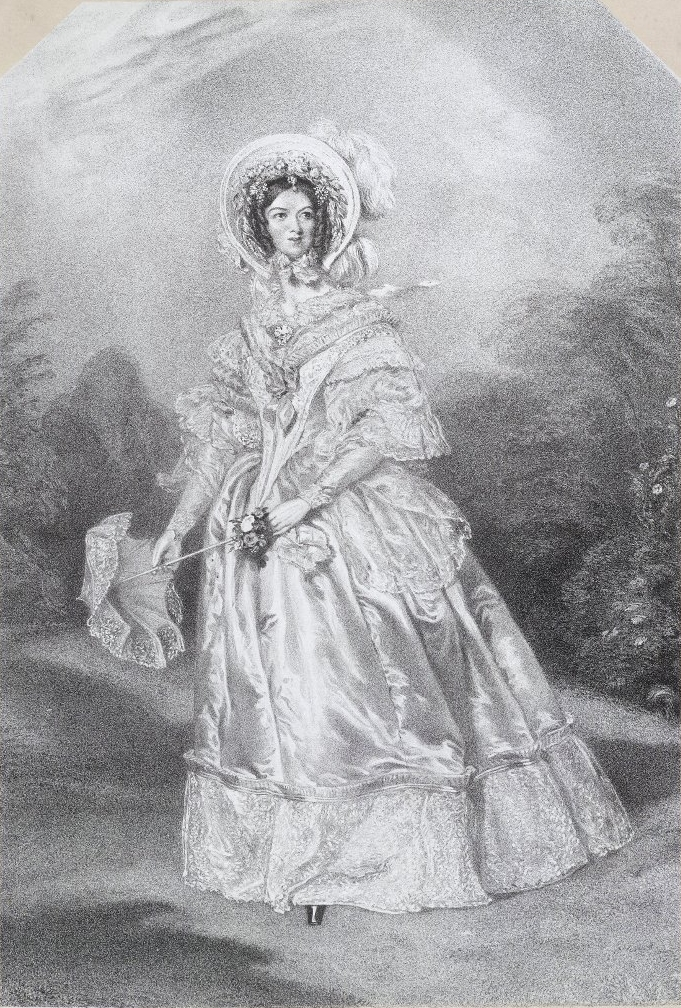
- Lithograph believed to be of Ann Thwaytes by R. J. Lane after A.E. Chalon. British Museum
- Born: Ann Hook; 2 October 1789; London, England
- Died: April 1866 (aged 76); Worthing, Sussex, England
- Resting place: Broadwater and Worthing Cemetery
- Monuments: Vaulted grave at cemetery; Blue plaque at Herne Bay.
- Occupation: Philanthropist
- Known for: Funding Clock Tower, Herne Bay
- Spouse: William Thwaytes (1749–1834)

Ann Thwaytes (2 October 1789 – April 1866), known to contemporaries as Mrs Thwaytes, was the wealthy and eccentric English widow of grocer William Thwaytes, owner of Davison, Newman & Co. She became the benefactress to many causes and funded the construction of the Clock Tower, Herne Bay.

== Youth and marriage ==
Mrs Thwaytes's mother (d.1803) called herself Mrs Hook, but had no husband. Ann Hook and her sister Sarah were born in London of humble origins either in Islington or near Balls Pond Road, Hackney: Sarah in 1788 and Ann on 2 October 1789. When their mother died, they were obliged, at ages fifteen and fourteen respectively, to take employment. In due course Sarah became housekeeper to William Thwaytes, who was by then the sole owner of Davison, Newman & Co. and a wealthy grocer and tea merchant.

On 19 May 1816 Sarah Hook married Alfred Tebbitt, Thwaytes's chief clerk, at St Martin's in the Fields, Westminster. In 1817 at the age of 28 years Ann married William Thwaytes (1749–1834) who was aged 67. During her marriage, Ann accused her husband of attempting to poison her with mercury. In 1832, during her husband's last illness, Ann developed a mental disorder which began with "low fever" (a 19th-century term for murine typhus) and a subsequent nervous state in which she remained for ten weeks facing the wall whilst believing she was blind. She recovered from the fever, but nevertheless declared that she was "immortal and part of the Trinity," and that she and the couple's family doctor John Simm Smith (1793–1877) had "important work to do." At Guy's Hospital Simm Smith had studied alongside John Keats and had known him well, and was to be the grandfather of Gerard Manley Hopkins.

== Widowhood ==
Ann's sister Sarah's husband Mr Tebbitt died in 1833, leaving her unsupported with seven children. Ann's husband died some months later in 1834 aged 85 years, leaving her a fortune of around £500,000 (equivalent to £56,188,693 in 2025) and no children. William Thwaytes's Will makes her a "joint executrix and main beneficiary" and describes her as his "beloved wife" in spite of her earlier suspicion that he was poisoning her. Ann soon became "very close" to her London surgeon Simm Smith. After her husband died, she paid Smith £2,000 (equivalent to £224,755 in 2025) per year and a total of £50,000 (equivalent to £5,618,869 in 2025) in gifts to temporarily give up his London medical practice to manage her business affairs. Simm was living in Croydon with his family and visiting Ann fortnightly, and Ann sometimes paid him "very large sums of money." Before her husband was even buried she had made her Will, leaving everything to Simm Smith except a small annuity for Sarah Tebbitt and her children. Soon after the funeral she was befriended by Simm's brother Samuel; he was a stockbroker whose wife had died, leaving him with two daughters and a debt of £3,000 (equivalent to £337,132 in 2025) which Ann paid.

=== Clapham, Finsbury and Herne Bay ===
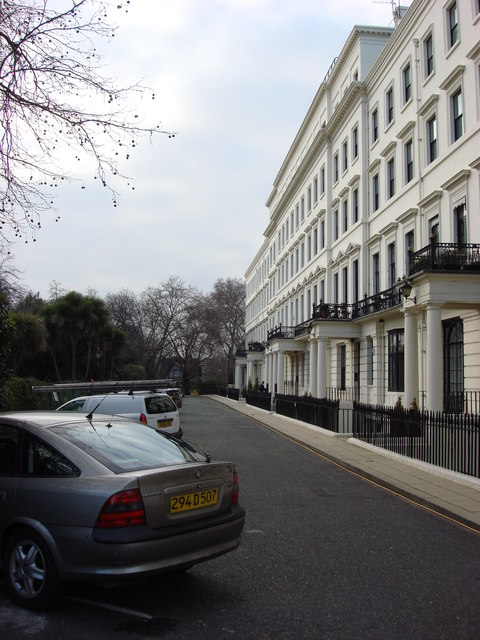
Hyde Park Gardens, 2007

Ann bought Cottage House at Clapham Common for herself, her sister Sarah Tebbitt and Sarah's children. She then moved to Finsbury Circus where she lived with her companion Louisa Little between August 1835 and January 1838. When she left Clapham she settled a capital of £30,000 (equivalent to £3,295,561.57 in 2025), and lifetime annuity on Sarah. However, at the 1867 Chancery hearing, Sarah maintained that the settlement was made at the behest of Simm Smith "to keep the family out of her pocket." She left Finsbury Circus around 1840. Meanwhile, between 1834 and 1840 she was spending part of each summer in Herne Bay.

=== Her town house, Paddington ===
In 1840 she bought her town house, 17 Hyde Park Gardens, Paddington. The drawing room was furnished lavishly in preparation for the Second Coming which she believed would take place there. The 1851 Census finds her at age 63 staying at her town house with her Charmandean lodger Samuel Smith, a butler, footman, three housemaids, a cook and a kitchen maid. She divided her time between her town and country houses until 1866 when she died in her Paddington home.

=== Her country house, Broadwater, Sussex ===
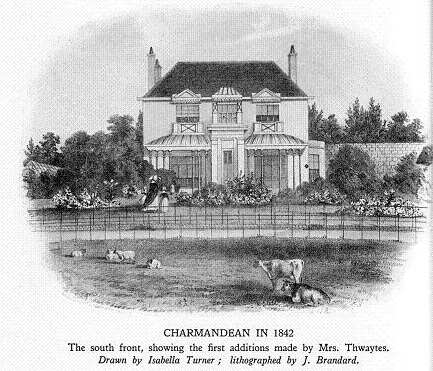
Charmandean, 1842

In 1841 she acquired her country house and estate, Charmandean at Broadwater, West Sussex. She maintained Samuel Smith and his family at Charmandean, funding the education of his daughters until they left to marry. Meanwhile, Samuel managed her accounts. Ann made many additions and improvements to Charmandean. In one room she installed panelling which had been removed from St. Mary's Church, Broadwater during repairs, and in her chapel-room she fitted a stained-glass window from the same church. She added an iron-framed conservatory, and two pairs of wrought iron entrance-gates made as replicas of the former Buckingham Palace gates. The western gates were requisitioned in World War II. The eastern iron gates remained in Charmandean Lane for some years but are now gone, leaving only the carved gateposts. The house was demolished in 1963.

=== Family rifts ===
During the 1840s, Ann offered to pay for a cadetship for one of Sarah's sons, but the offer was rejected. Sarah was called to Charmandean and told that Ann had been "advised by friends" to end their connection. A few years later, Ann was visited by one of Sarah's daughters who was received politely, but also told never to return. In 1850 Mrs Cook, another of Sarah's daughters, visited Ann and a friendship began. Ann bought this niece a house in Broadwater, but Mrs Cook too was rejected by Ann due to a financial disagreement, and cut off with a comfortable £450 (equivalent to £52,375.89 in 2025) per annum.

=== Death and contested will ===
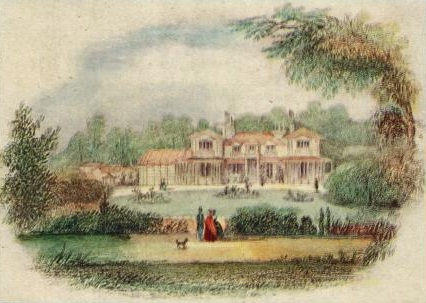
Charmandean, 19th century

She died aged 76 at her London town house in 1866, and was buried on 13 April in a vaulted grave at Broadwater and Worthing Cemetery, in plot C4.1–4.10–13, near the North Chapel. Her estate was worth £400,000 (equivalent to £41,165,611 in 2025). £45,000 (equivalent to £4,631,131 in 2025) was left to her nieces and nephews, but there was no legacy for her sister Sarah Tebbitt. She left £5,000 (equivalent to £514,570 in 2025) to Dr Collett who attended her last illness, and generous legacies to servants and acquaintances. One account says that she left the remainder of the estate, plus £30,000 (equivalent to £3,087,421 in 2025) and Charmandean her country house, to Simm Smith. His brother inherited the other half of the residue, and was to inherit Charmandean after Simm Smith's death. Another account says that Simm Smith and his brother Samuel were to inherit £180,000 (equivalent to £18,524,525 in 2025).

From 26 April to May 1867, The Times reported the case of Smith and Others v Tebbitt and Others, in which Sarah Tebbitt and two nieces contested her Will "on the grounds of undue execution, incapacity and undue influence." At the hearing, the legatees declared Ann sane whereas those left out of the Will, led by Ann's nephew, recounted her religious delusions. It was during this case that the unmarried situation of Ann Thwaytes's mother came to light, because illegitimacy might put Sarah Tebbitt's position of rightful heir in doubt. On 6 August 1867 the judge cited monomania as her illness, and found that she was of unsound mind when signing her Will, thus making it invalid. He said, however, that if she had been found to have been in sound mind, there remained the question of possible undue influence by the Smith brothers, putting the validity of the Will doubly in doubt.

== Religious delusions ==
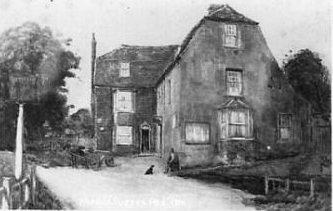
Sussex Pad Inn, before 1905

These delusions appear to have started in 1832 with the "low fever" and the conviction that she was part of the Trinity, and they continued for the rest of her life. During the full moon at Broadwater she was observed by worried neighbours to dress in white and to drive the same route in her yellow carriage ritually: past the old Sussex Pad Inn (now replaced with a hotel), over Old Shoreham Bridge, and back home again." She thought she was the Bride of Christ and that Judgement Day would occur in her lavishly-prepared Hyde Park drawing room. She would talk to her friend Louisa Little, her niece Mrs Cook who noted Ann's sayings in a diary, and to servants and tradesmen, about her religious beliefs, but would close the discussion if rebuffed. She would allow sermons to be read to her, and did not attend church; however she paid for a vault at Broadwater and Worthing Cemetery for the interment of Simm Smith and herself.

== Gifts and donations ==
=== Motivations for philanthropy ===
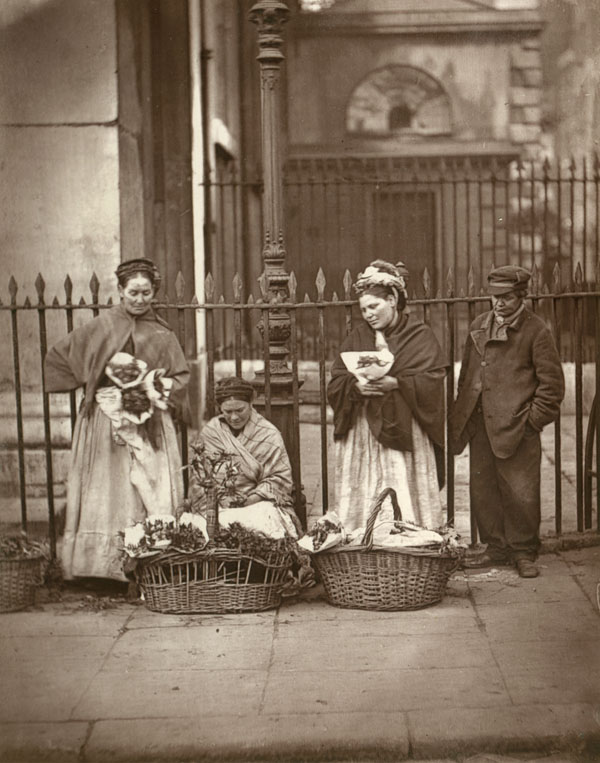
Working class Londoners, 1877. Ann Thwaytes could not hide her humble origins

Besides straightforward compassion for the poor, there are two other possible motivations for Mrs Thwaytes's philanthropy. Firstly there was the 19th-century progress of Evangelicalism, which encouraged good works from those with religious sensibility and social pity. Secondly, following the expansion of the middle classes in the 18th and 19th centuries, beneficence was "an avenue for entry into elite society for women and gave them a sense of place and direction outside the home." In other words, for a woman of known humble origins and at the same time a wealthy widow looking for a place in society, philanthropy would be in her best interests. However 19th-century British elite society was based in the popular imagination upon elegant culture, not money or good deeds, and Herne Bay Clock Tower's opening ceremony drew mockery from the Figaro in London of 6 October 1836, in which she was called a Cockney and her clock, celebration and philanthropy laughed at.

=== Herne Bay area ===
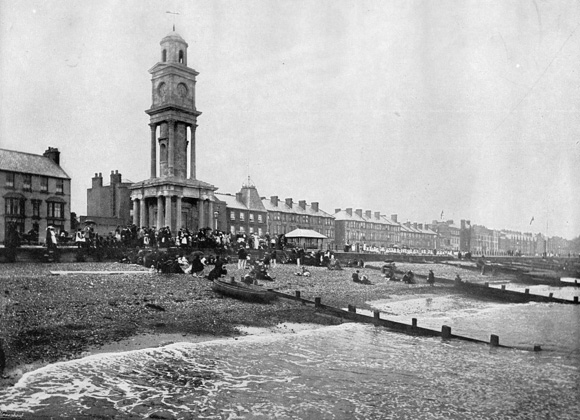
Clock Tower in 1895

Between 1834 and 1840 she visited Herne Bay regularly with friends, staying at 30 Marine Terrace on Central Parade, and became an established town benefactor of Herne Bay. She funded and laid the foundation stone in 1836 for two schoolrooms to be built as an extension of Christ Church in William Street. This church had recently been founded by Sir Henry Oxenden, and her friend Simm Smith was head of the trustees for the church. In August 1836 she donated £4,000 or £5,000 (equivalent to £493,779 in 2025), the full cost of the planning and building of a . . .

. . . Grecian temple, 70 feet high, on the top of which is to be fixed a clock . . . the fabric will be of quadrangular form, supported at each corner by pillars of the Corinthian order. At the top will be a cupola or dome, immediately beneath which the clock, with four illuminated dials, will be placed. Kentish Gazette, 23 August 1836

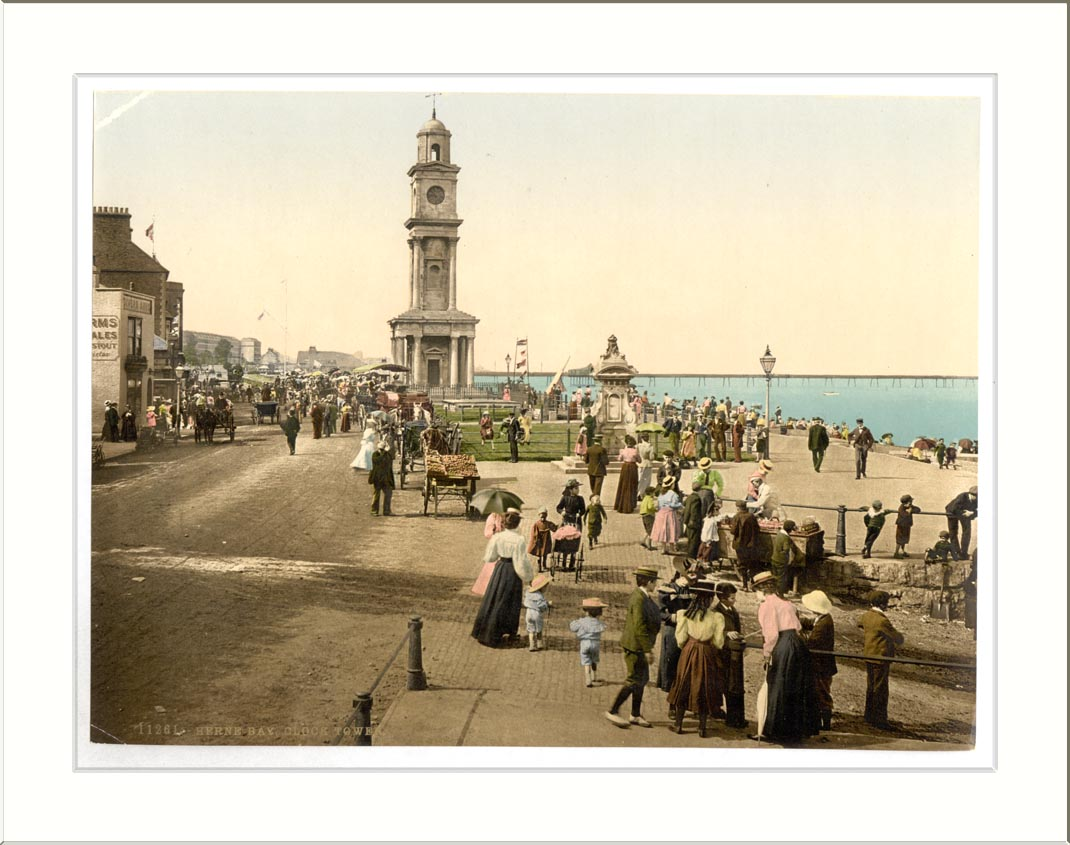
Clock Tower, 1899–1905

In the address which was read to her when she laid the foundation stone, some of her good deeds were enumerated:

The poorer inhabitants, the labourers and mechanics especially, will gratefully acknowledge that to your unexampled liberality they are indebted for many of their past comforts, for their present employment and for the education of their children. Mr George Rohrs, secretary to the Clock Tower trustees, 3 October 1836

On the opening day of the Clock Tower, 2 October 1837, there was a festival, followed by annual commemoration festivals which may also have been funded by Mrs Thwaytes. There is a blue plaque, recording that she funded the Clock Tower, at Central Parade, Herne Bay.

According to the late Herne Bay historian, Harold Gough, Mrs Thwaytes suddenly "took a huff" and left Herne Bay. After the Clock Tower had been opened, builder George Burge began work on the old St John's Church in Brunswick Square. Eventually the money ran out; Burge ran out of bricks and had to delay completion. Around 1839 to 1840, Burge informed Mrs Thwaytes that if the Clock Tower's bricks had been available for the building of the church, St John's would have been completed "long before." In response, Mrs Thwaytes left Herne Bay, never to return.

=== Broadwater area ===
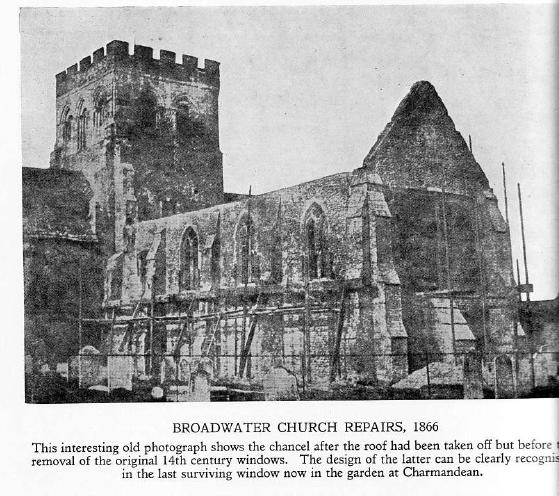
St Marys, renovations 1866

One of Ann's first good works at Charmandean was to give coal to the poor. A Broadwater coal distribution society was formed; she supported this and continued to distribute coal regularly. She contributed generously to a subscription appeal for a new infirmary at Broadwater. This project was started by her friend and consulting surgeon Dr Frederick Dixon who had founded the local Worthing Dispensary in 1829 and treated poor patients for free. Dixon was an amateur geologist who died young, and Ann funded his book, The Geology of Sussex when it was published posthumously. She became financially involved in the 1853–1855 restoration of St. Mary's Church, Broadwater, contributing to chancel repairs, giving £100 (equivalent to £10,985.21 in 2025) towards a new organ and committing to the payment of £40 (equivalent to £4,394.08 in 2025) per year to the organist. She contributed towards one of the new stained glass windows which was dedicated to the late Reverends Peter Wood and William Davison.
