= William Mortimer (cricketer) =

English cricketer and British Army officer

Personal information
- Full name: William Picton Mortimer
- Born: c. 1833; England
- Died: 22 December 1916 (aged 83); Cheltenham, Gloucestershire, England
- Batting: Unknown
- Relatives: George Mortimer (brother)

Career statistics
Competition	First-class
Matches	1
Runs scored	1
Batting average	0.50
100s/50s	–/–
Top score	1
Balls bowled	–
Wickets	–
Bowling average	–
5 wickets in innings	–
10 wickets in match	–
Best bowling	–
Catches/stumpings	–/–
- Source: Cricinfo, 2 October 2018

William Picton Mortimer (c. 1833 – 22 December 1916) was an English first-class cricketer and British Army officer.

Mortimer was born in about 1833, one of twenty children of Edward Horlock Mortimer and his wife, Frances Lardner. He made one appearance in first-class cricket for the Surrey Club against the Marylebone Cricket Club at Lord's in 1853. He batted in both Surrey Club innings', being dismissed without scoring by Jemmy Dean in their first-innings, while in their second-innings he was dismissed by James Grundy. He served in the British Army with the 80th Regiment of Foot in British India, later serving with the 11th Hussars, where he held the rank of lieutenant colonel. He died at Cheltenham in December 1916.
