= Clock Tower, Herne Bay =

Grade II listed landmark in Kent, England

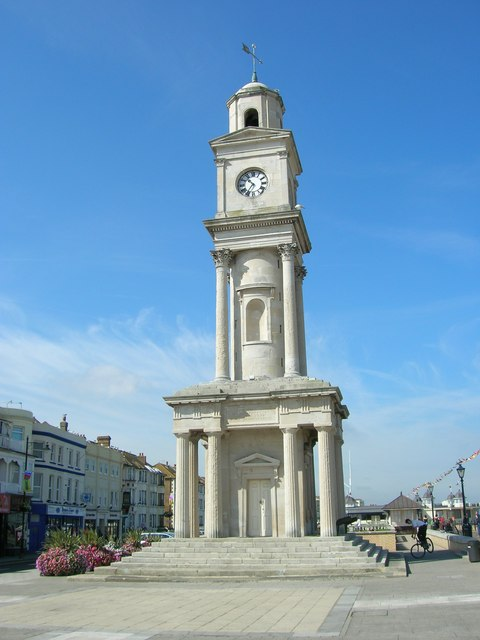
- Clock tower, 2006

- Location within Kent

General information
- Architectural style: Eclectic, neoclassical
- Location: Central Parade, Herne Bay, Kent, CT6 5JJ, England
- Coordinates: 51°22′23″N 1°07′35″E
- Elevation: 20.5 m (67 ft)
- Construction started: 3 October 1836; 189 years ago
- Opened: 2 October 1837; 188 years ago
- Cost: 5,000 GBP
- Client: Herne Bay Urban District Council
- Owner: City of Canterbury

Height
- Height: 77 ft (23 m) excl. weather vane 85 ft (26 m) incl. weather vane.

Design and construction
- Architect: Edwin James Dangerfield
- Structural engineer: Ambrose Hukins
- Awards: Grade II listed

Website
- www.clocktowerfriends.org

The Clock Tower, Herne Bay (built 1837), is a Grade II listed landmark in Herne Bay, Kent, England. It is believed to be one of the earliest purpose-built, free-standing clock towers in the United Kingdom. It was funded by Mrs Ann Thwaytes, and now serves as a memorial to the fallen of the Second Boer War.

The clock tower was designed by Edwin James Dangerfield, and was possibly inspired by a Royal Exchange Assurance lead firemark badge which bore a picture of the Royal Exchange tower. It was built with deep foundations of arches and vaults, and its core is of brick, with Portland stone cladding. Its height has been estimated to be 77 feet (23 m) tall, or 85 feet (26 m) including the weather vane. Its original turret clock mechanism has been replaced by a synchronous electric hour striking unit, but it still retains its 12 cwt bell.

== The benefactor ==
At the time of the erection of the Clock Tower, Ann Thwaytes (1789–1866) was the rich widow of London grocer William Thwaytes. Between 1834 and 1840 she visited Herne Bay regularly with friends, staying with Mr Camplin who owned number 8 (now 30) Marine Terrace on Central Parade, and became an established town benefactor of Herne Bay. While there in 1836 she donated £4,000 for the erection of the Clock Tower, which may have cost £5,000 to build. A blue plaque has been erected in her memory by City of Canterbury Council, at Central Parade near the Clock Tower.

=== Inspiration and planning ===
The Clock Tower was conceived within five years of the completion of Herne Bay's first pier of 1832, when the town was in the throes of its initial popularity and development. Herne Bay historian Mike Bundock suggests a possible inspiration for the unusual design of this tower. On the back of 31 Marine Terrace, next door to Mrs Thwaytes' holiday residence, was a Royal Exchange Assurance lead firemark badge which bore a picture of the Royal Exchange tower, designed by Edward Jarman in 1721. Mrs Thwaytes was already familiar with the Royal Exchange tower, as she had lived close to it during her marriage. In 1836, possibly inspired by the success of the nearby pier and the grandeur of this image, Mrs Thwaytes requested the young architect Edwin James Dangerfield (1807–1879) of London and Herne Bay to draw a plan of a tower in the style of a Grecian temple with a clock at the top.

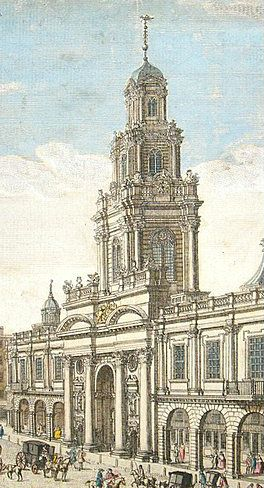
The old Royal Exchange which may have inspired the Clock Tower

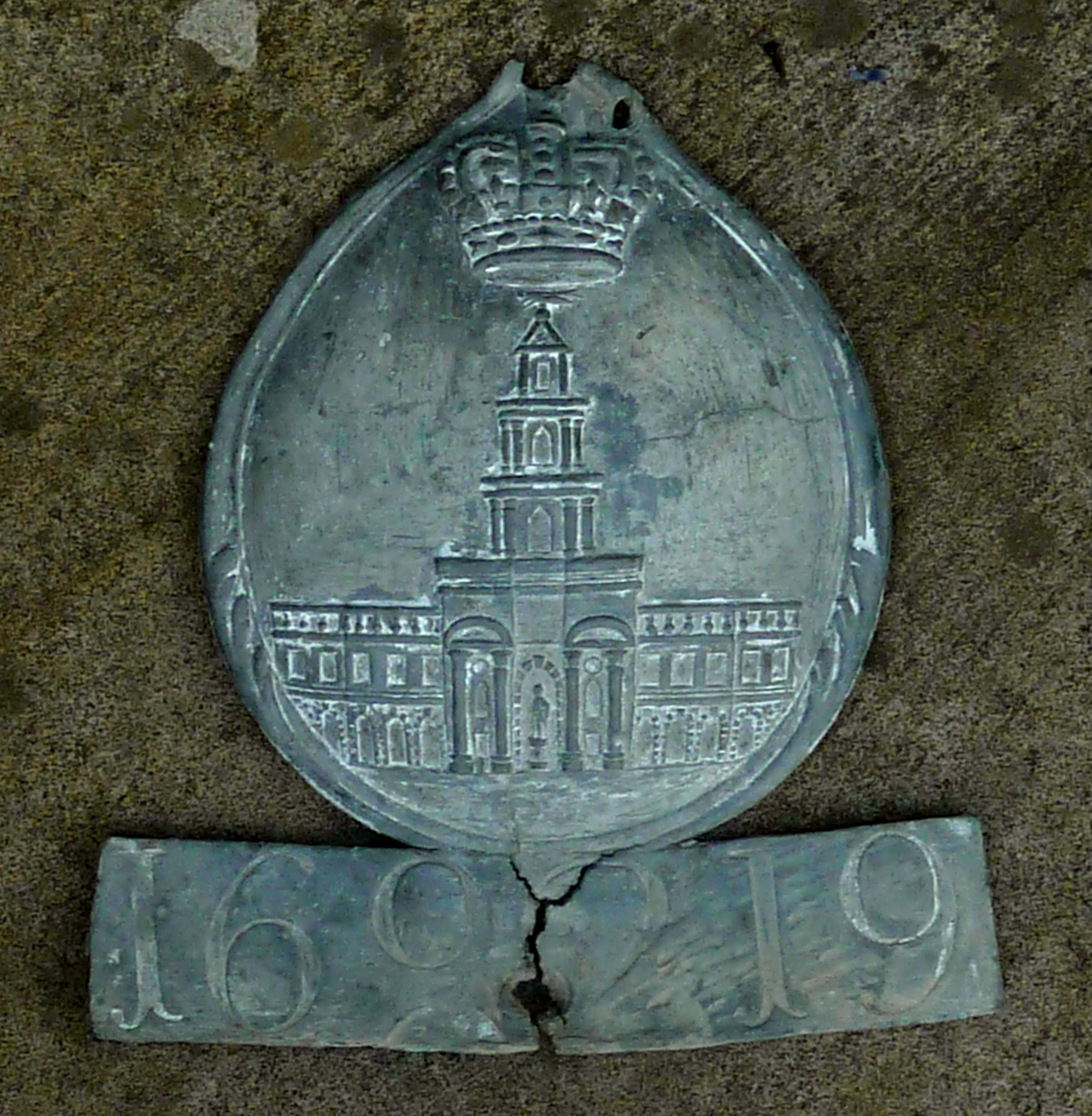
Royal Exchange Assurance firemark badge

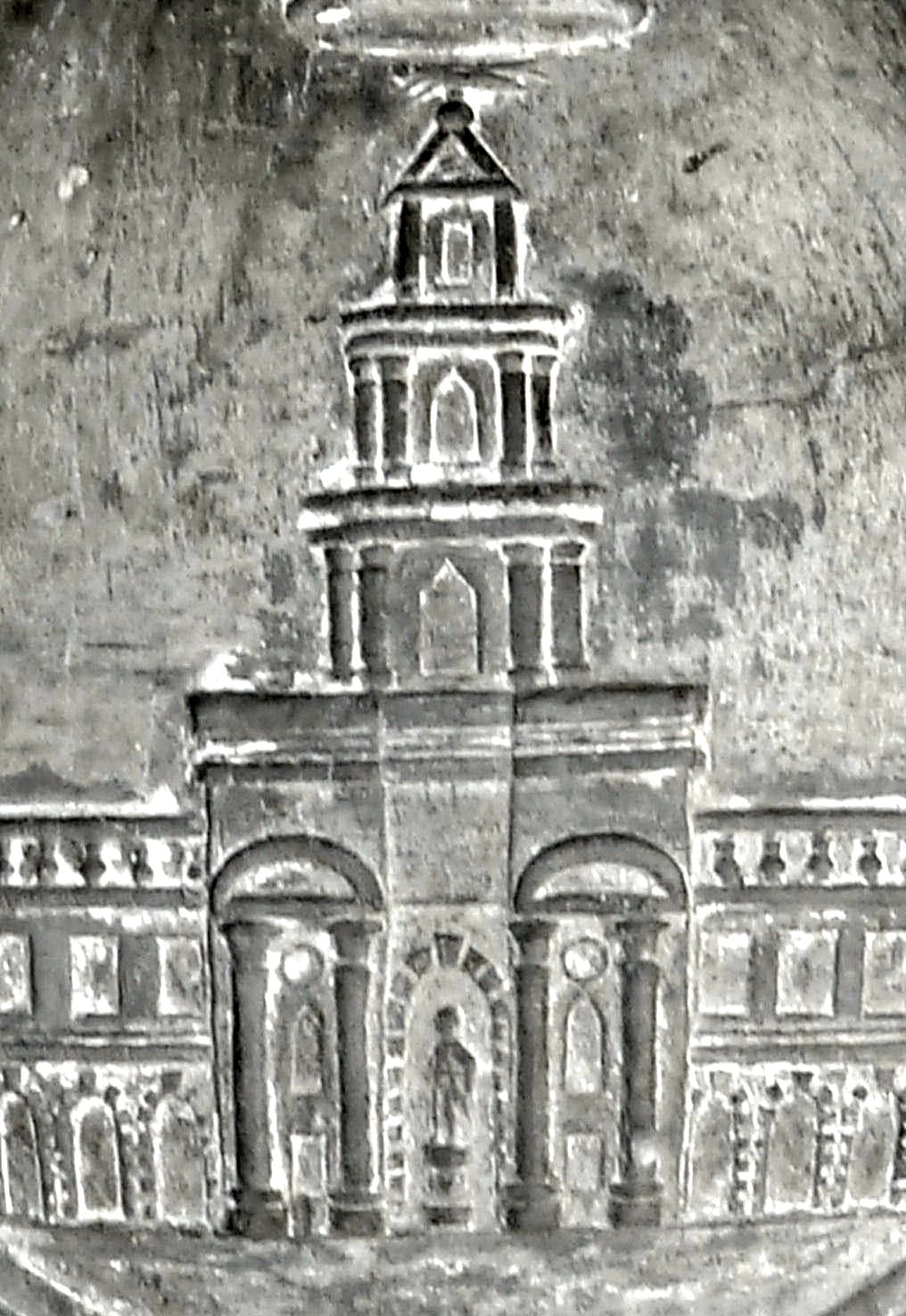
Royal Exchange Assurance firemark badge, closeup

== The building ==
This landmark structure is considered by Herne Bay historian Mike Bundock to be one of the earliest purpose-built, freestanding clock towers in the United Kingdom, and it has been a traditional symbol of Herne Bay since 1894 alongside the heron and Reculver Towers. Estimates of height vary, but according to Mike Bundock it is 77 feet (23 m) tall, or 85 feet (26 m) including the weather vane. The clock dials are 5 feet (1.5 m) diameter. It was designed by Edwin James Dangerfield (1807–1879) of London and Herne Bay, and built by Ambrose Hukins (1788–1864), formerly of Chilham and Chartham and latterly of St Augustine's Cottage, William Street, Herne Bay.

=== Design ===
The building was listed in 1951, and there is a full description of the design in the Listed Building entry 1085006. The eclectic Victorian design has been criticised by John Newman in the 1965 Buildings of England series. He speaks of an "inept design" and of a "classical vocabulary thus debased," saying that the second stage of Corinthian columns should have been smaller than the first Doric stage of columns. He adds that the top is "hurriedly finished off."

=== Structure ===
The building required deep foundations: "not solid but an elaborate series of arches and vaults," being built close to the sea on shingle and just west of the culverted outflow of Plenty Brook, hence the total estimated cost of £5,000. The vaults were infilled with concrete after inspection in 1964. The Tower's core is brick, with Portland stone cladding. The following legend is inscribed on the building: The gift of Mrs Ann Thwaytes to this town 11 Oct A.D. MDCCCXXXVII. Originally the Tower contained a clock mechanism and 12 cwt bell. In 1837 there were iron railings at the base around the steps but these were removed in 1937.

=== Clock mechanism and bell ===
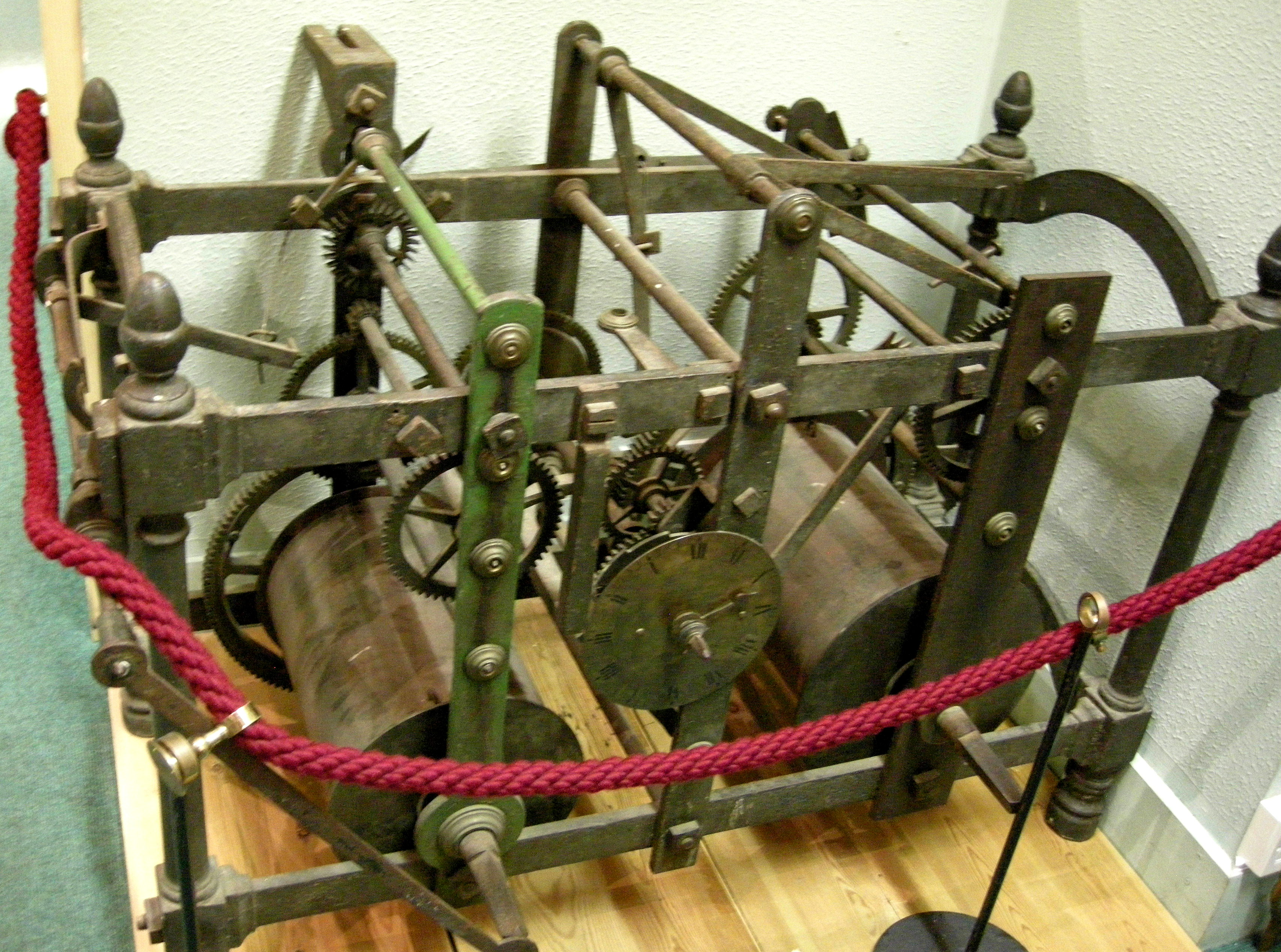
Turret clock mechanism from the Tower, in Herne Bay Museum

As of 2010, the original 1836 turret clock mechanism by John Moore Junior (later John Moore & Sons) was on display at Herne Bay Museum and Gallery, having been replaced in 1971. The mechanism is sometimes erroneously attributed to Peter Morton of Herne Bay and John Greenwood of Canterbury because their names are engraved on the front, however they were the suppliers and could not have manufactured such a large mechanism. This mechanism is listed in John Moore's 1877 catalogue as: "Herne Bay, Kent. Four 5ft dials, the gift of Mrs Thwaites (sic)." It was installed in the tower on a trestle and encased in a deal box, with doors for access to the winding mechanism. It had extra brass wheels for the striking bell, and was held in an iron frame. The clock had to be wound twice a week, the clock weights providing the stored energy. The pendulum was about 12 feet (3.7 m) long, giving a slow beat of nearly two seconds. The clock winder had to ascend 66 steps, then turn the heavy strike winder 75 times, and the time winder 20 times, using a crank. The bell, made of bell metal, was supplied by Thomas Mears II in 1837, weighs 12 cwt and measures 36 inches (91 cm) high and 46 inches (120 cm) diameter. The bell is still functioning in the Tower.

The last long-serving clock winder, Louis Morgan, retired in 1964. The Council hired Peter Hutton between 1965 and 1970, then in 1971 installed a synchronous electric hour striking unit: two small black boxes installed by John Smith & Son of Derby.

== History ==
=== Laying the foundation stone ===
At midday on 3 October 1836 the foundation stone was laid by Ann Thwaytes. At 11 am gentlemen inhabitants, subscribers and visitors joined a procession at the St George's Baths and walked with the local charity school children (beneficiaries of Mrs Thwaytes) to the site to present her with a silver trowel. The ceremony was watched by invited ladies seated on a dais in a plantation decorated with flags, and enlivened by a military band. At 2 pm the charity children and their parents, totalling 500, received a free dinner provided by Mrs Thwaytes. In the afternoon there were boat races, a punt chase and a tightrope performance. On the Pier during the evening there was a Grand Illumination, a firework display, another tightrope performance, magic feats by Ching Lau Lauro, a model of the Clock Tower in fireworks, the Pier entrance illuminated by 30,000 variegated lamps, and a released balloon carrying Mrs Thwaytes' name in fire. An address of thanks to her was read by George Rohrs, secretary to the Clock Tower trustees who had been appointed by Mrs Thwaytes.

=== The opening ceremony ===
It was opened at twelve o'clock on Mrs Thwaytes' 48th birthday, 2 October 1837. A large triumphal arch intertwined with greenery and topped with flags was built close to the Clock Tower. Mrs Thwaytes, accompanied by Simm Smith and wearing a blue satin crinoline, was conveyed along the very short distance from her residence to the Clock Tower in the first of a train of carriages containing trustees of the Clock Tower and other personages bearing wands and wearing blue rosettes. This procession was preceded by blue and white flags and a band, and followed by a cheering multitude. On arrival at the site, the multitude cheered again loudly and hats were thrown. It was noted that Mrs Thwaytes was slightly unwell, but she thanked the crowd. Simm Smith read out her address in which she presented the Clock Tower to the town. At the beginning and end of the ceremony a salute was fired from the four fog-warning cannon on the pier, and a free meal was provided for a hundred charity children, their parents, and the construction workers who built the Tower. Large numbers of gentlemen ate dinners and drank toasts at the Kent and Pier hotels. In the evening there was a firework display and a clock tower in variegated fire created by Mr Fewick who had been in charge of fireworks at the 1836 ceremony. Opening Day was also celebrated by villagers in Herne which was festooned with decorations following Mrs Thwaytes' distribution of money, food and goods. Celebrations on the anniversary of this opening ceremony and Mrs Thwaytes' birthday continued until at least 1839 when the gentry enjoyed a dinner, ball and concert.

=== Early history ===
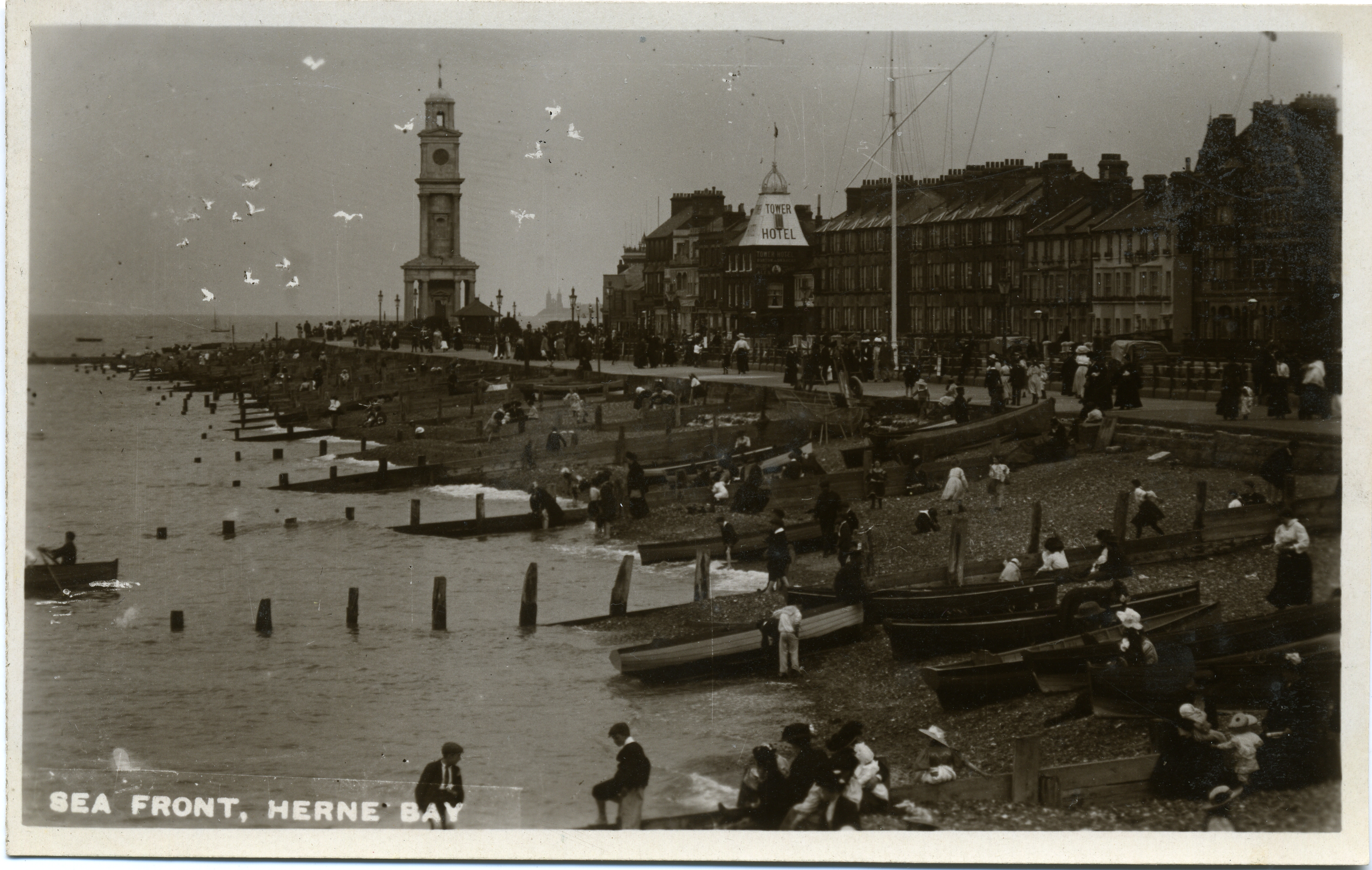
Tower from Pier by Fred C. Palmer, before 1914

On the north-east and north-west corners of the steps two cannon were placed, some time after 1900. They are possibly Dutch in origin, and were found on the seabed on 11 January and 10 April 1899 during the construction of the third Herne Bay Pier. They fired blanks as a fog-warning, and had been mounted on the first Pier until 1862. New carriages and brass plates dating the recovery were made for them. They stood outside the old Pier Theatre and were moved later to the base of the Tower. A plaque, dedicated to the 36 fallen Herne Bay volunteers of the Second Boer War, was affixed shortly after 1902 to the north side. It features some well-known local surnames, such as Ridout.

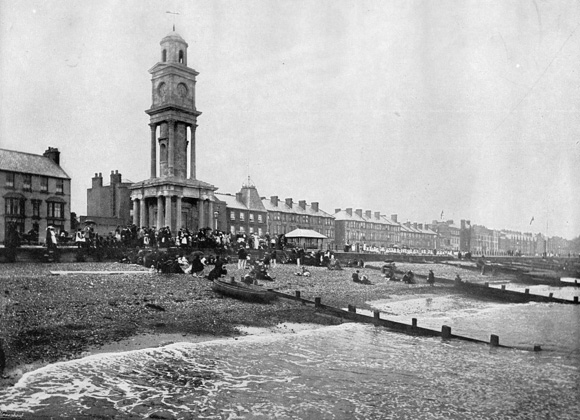
Clock Tower in 1895, by Francis Frith

=== 20th century ===
The building was listed as Grade II on 29 September 1951. The site has been vulnerable to erosion and flooding, but in the 1990s a sea defence called Neptune's Arm was built to protect this area from the effect of strong onshore winds at high tide. During the late 20th century the Tower supported some of the seafront illuminations, but these have been removed. As of 2000, there was a CCTV camera fixed to the top of the building.

== Renovation and repairs ==
=== 1905 repairs and accident ===
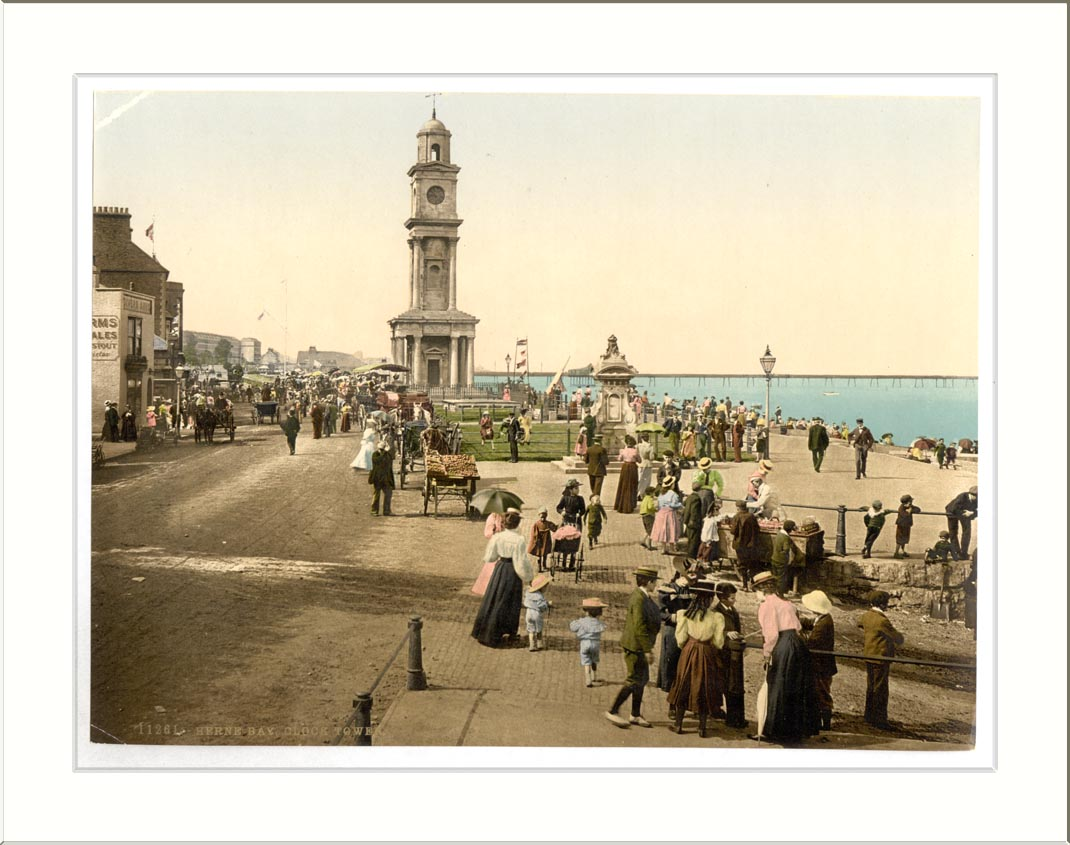
Clock Tower 1899–1905

The Tower was renovated in 1905 due to weather-erosion of the Portland stone. The clock dials were converted to white opal glass. Three of the dials were illuminated by gas, but the seaward-facing dial was not, being disallowed by the Admiralty. The worn stone pillars were to be rotated by 180° to hide the worn areas, and builders A.S. Ingleton and J. Masters were hired.

Scaffolders Spratt and Griggs were working on the morning of Saturday 13 May 1905, and stopped for a tea break. Spratt went home while Edward Henry Griggs sheltered inside the base of the Tower. One of the hemp strike-weight ropes broke, and the 4 feet (120 cm) by 1 foot (30 cm) diameter iron strike weight, weighing about 5 cwt, crashed 25 feet (7.6 m) through two floors and "smashed to a pulp" Griggs' thighs as he sat on the floor drinking his tea. The noise brought the nearby lavatory attendant, who brought a clerk called Wacher, who sent for the doctor Tom Bowes and the Ambulance Corps who took Griggs to the Queen Victoria Memorial Cottage Hospital where he had both legs amputated but died at 11.30am, aged 32 years and leaving a wife and four children. The clock-winder Alfred Smith was an old man, having started this job before 1847. He stopped the clock at 9.45 am and removed the other clock weight. He told the inquest that the hemp ropes were due for replacement and that he had unsuccessfully requested new ropes from the Council, on three occasions during the previous two months. There was a big local funeral on Tuesday 6 May, and the Council started a fund for the relief of the widow. Alfred Smith retired around 1907.

=== 2009 repairs ===
In 2009 a complaint to City of Canterbury Council about the Tower clock not working elicited a reply and a full repair within one month.

=== 21st century repairs ===
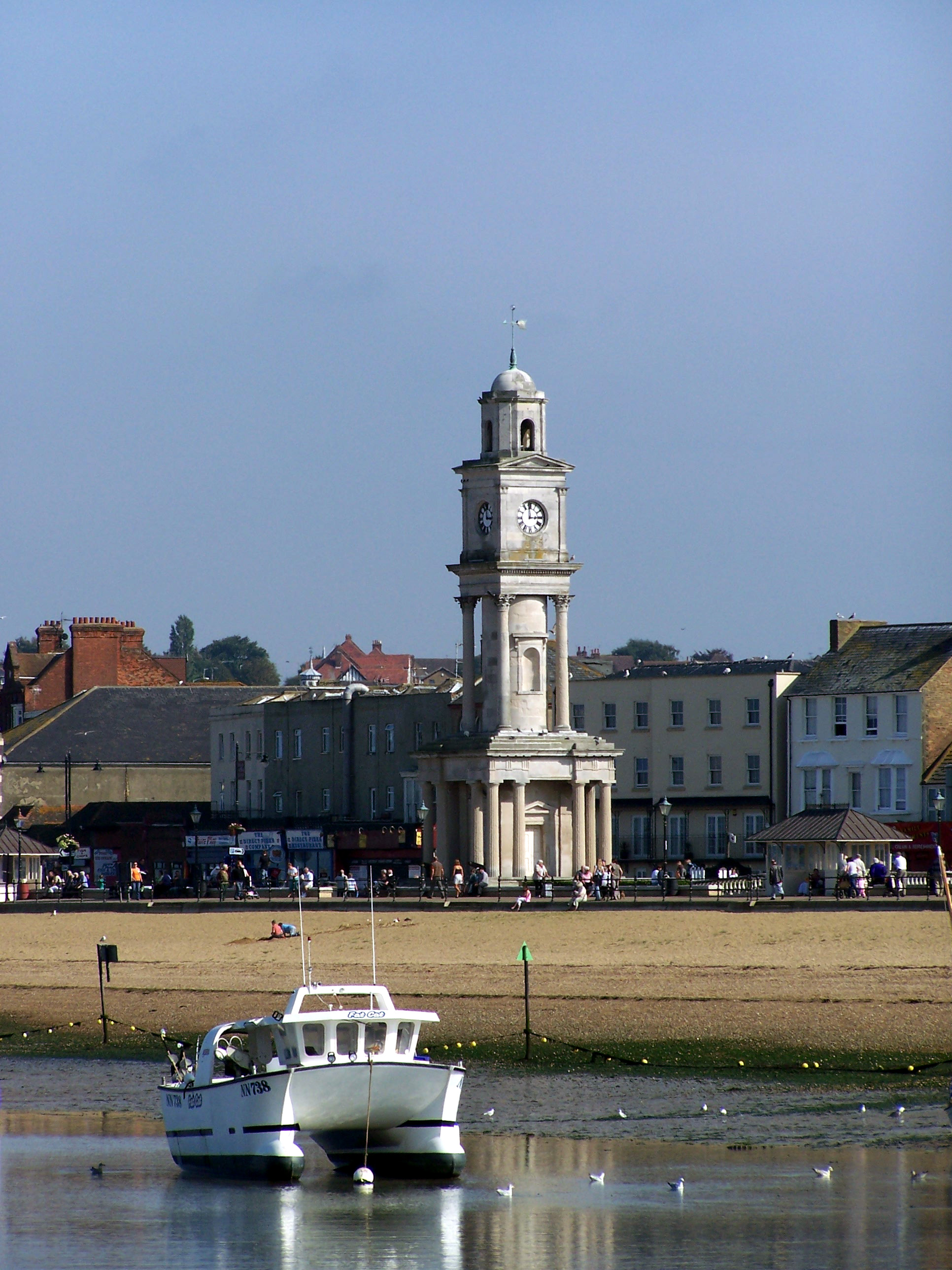
Tower, 2008

In 2012, City of Canterbury Council initiated a £348,000 project and applied for Lottery funding to renovate the structure which had been eroded by salt water and gales. The Council obtained an initial development grant of £16,000 in April 2012, with the obligation to contribute £100,000. The second phase bid for the remainder of the funding would take place in November 2013. The renovation would take place between April and August 2014 and would include four webcams to relay views of sea front activity, plus a fifth to relay an interior view of the clock workings. There would be LED fairy lights to highlight the tower all year round as a night-time attraction. The lottery bid required the creation of a Friends of Herne Bay Clock Tower group of volunteers to "educate, promote and conserve" on behalf of the building. Their activities would be centred at the old Pier Trust Gallery, which would become a shop, information and exhibition centre and workshop for the volunteers and visitors. The area around the Tower, now called the Tower Plaza, would host Project events.

== Culture ==
On 20 February 2013, a flash mob performed the Harlem Shake in the Clock Tower Plaza. The Clock Tower gained its own Twitter account in 2013. On 4 May 2013, when the clock chimed 2pm, a geocaching flash mob gathered around the Tower.

In 2014 The Friends of Herne Bay Clock Tower commissioned author Faye Beerling to write a children's book, Tales From the Clock Tower. It was launched on 23 August 2014 in the Friends of Herne Bay Clock Tower information centre. It later became an audio book narrated by John Pennington and published by Fairy Faye Publications. Together with the Friends of Herne Bay Clock Tower, they distributed this book as part of Key Stage 1 learning packs sent out to local schools.

In 2015, Canterbury Christ Church University graduate Sally Ann Chittenden of Milmino Studios, was commissioned to transform Tales From the Clock Tower into an animation. It premièred with a private screening at Herne Bay's Kavanagh cinema with invited VIP guests, and also with a public première around the tower itself, with a large firework display and an Olly Murs tribute act. The film features many places around Herne Bay as the seagulls and their crab friend explore the history of this seaside town. On 31 October 2015, Tales From the Clock Tower celebrated with a Halloween special, where the characters dance to The Monster Mash by the Groovy Goolies. The clock tower and the surrounding town is featured within this short.

== See also ==
- Grade II* listed buildings in City of Canterbury
- Herne Bay Museum and Gallery which contains the original clock mechanism from the Clock Tower.

== Bibliography ==
Note: Many of the online and published resources for the history of the Clock Tower are at least partially sourced from an unpublished work by the late Harold Gough, president of the Herne Bay Historical Records Society from 1992 to 2008, who was the first to research this subject. Some of his work is held by the HBHRS or his heirs.

- Bundock, Mike (2000). Herne Bay Clock Tower: A descriptive history (1 ed.). Herne Bay: Pierhead Publications. ISBN 9780953897704. Contains archive images
- Bundock, Mike (February 2011). Victorian Herne Bay. Herne Bay Past. Vol. 6. Herne Bay: Pierhead Publications. ISBN 9781904661160. Contains archive images
- Bundock, Mike (September 2016). Herne Bay Clock Tower: a descriptive history (2 ed.). Herne Bay: Friends of Herne Bay Clock Tower. Contains archive images. Available from The Seaside Museum, Herne Bay
