= Emma Elizabeth Thoyts =

English palaeographer and historian

Emma Elizabeth Thoyts (1860–1949), a.k.a. Mrs. John Hauntenville Cope, was an English palaeographer, amateur historian, and genealogist.

== Biography ==
Emma Elizabeth Thoyts was born in Bryanston Square, Marylebone in Middlesex on 8 July 1860, the eldest daughter Major William Richard Mortimer Thoyts of Sulhamstead House, Berkshire, and his wife, Anne Annabella Puleston. She was the great-granddaughter of William Thoyts, the High Sheriff of Berkshire, and grew up at Sulhamstead House where she developed an interest in history. She wrote widely, particularly upon subjects related to Sulhamstead and the surrounding villages and the families who lived there. She transcribed many Berkshire parish registers and soon became a recognised expert on the reading of ancient handwriting. One of her few published works, How to Decipher and Study Old Documents (1893), is still in print today under the title How to Read Old Documents. Her many manuscript works are now in the Berkshire Local Studies Library in Reading.

In 1899, Thoyts married one of the last of the great Cope family from Bramshill House in Hampshire, John Hautenville Cope. He was a fellow historian and major contributor to the Victoria County History of Berkshire. The two settled in Finchampstead in Berkshire, where Emma died on 9 November 1949, having outlived her husband by seven years and a day. They are buried together in the churchyard at St Mary's, Eversley, the Cope family burial ground. They also have a memorial plaque inside the church.
