= Colonel Richard Newman =

English Barrister

Richard Newman (c. 1620 - 1695), of Fifehead Magdalen, Dorset, was an important member of the Newman family of Wessex, a barrister, High Steward of Westminster, and squire of Fifehead-Magdalen and Evercreech. He was also a colonel in the Royalist forces during the English Civil War.

== Background ==
Richard Newman was born at Fifehead Magdalen, Dorset, the son of Richard Newman and Elizabeth née Perry. He was educated at Sherborne, to which he later donated "two gloabes", Pembroke College, Oxford and Middle Temple.

== English Civil War ==
Newman was appointed High Steward of Westminster and joined the Royalist forces during the English Civil War with the rank of colonel. He lent money in support of Charles I, and in 1651 assisted the young King Charles II escape after the Battle of Worcester, where Charles's largely Scottish army was defeated at the hands of Oliver Cromwell's New Model Army. According to contemporary sources, the king escaped through the gate of the city of Worcester through the heroic efforts of Colonel Newman. He was subsequently tried and briefly imprisoned, but was then permitted to practice as a barrister during the later Protectorate, though confined to the borough of Westminster.

At the Restoration in 1660, Charles II rewarded Newman with an augmentation to his coat of arms, in the form of an escutcheon gules (red shield) and a crowned portcullis or (gold coloured portcullis surmounted by a crown), and a large sum of money, which is likely to have been partial reimbursement of funds loaned to Charles I.

== Family life ==
He either inherited the Fifehead-Magdalen manor from elder brother, Thomas (d.1668), or from his father Richard Newman (d.1664), despite being the younger of two brothers. He was gifted Evercreech Park directly from his father Richard [senior], this estate later overseen by elder brother Thomas during Richard's imprisonment and subsequent confinement to Westminster. Thomas was obliquely mentioned in the Witchfinder-general's report (1664) as the 'gentleman of Evercreech', scandalising his family by leading a coven as its 'Robin Goodfellow'. He was buried four years after the Witchfinder's Report in a marble tub outside the church at Fifehead with the inscription, 'One swallow doth not make the spring'. A martlet or legless swallow, which descendants termed the 'flighty bird' since being legless it cannot rest, was the Newman heraldic beast.

Richard Newman married Anne, the daughter of Sir Charles Harbord, Surveyor General to Charles I, and Maria née van Aelst, and had four sons, the eldest of whom, Richard Newman, succeeded him at Fifehead Magdalen, and three daughters including Elizabeth who married Sir William Honeywood.

Colonel Richard retained both Evercreech Park and as sole surviving legitimate heir the family home in Fifehead, where in 1693 he visited and was responsible for building the Newman chapel on the north side of the church to cover the vault containing the graves of his ancestors. Here he too was buried on 16 October 1695.
