= George Frederick Baskerville Mortimer =

English cricketer

George Mortimer
Personal information
- Full name: George Frederick Baskerville Mortimer
- Born: 18 July 1816; Trowbridge, Wiltshire, England
- Died: 1854 (aged 37/38); England
- Batting: Unknown
- Bowling: Unknown
- Relatives: William Mortimer (brother)

George Frederick Baskerville Mortimer (18 July 1816 – 1854) was an English cricketer.

Mortimer was born at Trowbridge, Wiltshire in July 1816, one of twenty children of Edward Horlock Mortimer and his wife, Frances Lardner. He made one appearance for the Surrey Club against the Marylebone Cricket Club at Lord's in 1852. He was not called upon to bat or bowl during the match. He died at some point in 1854.
