= Mount Bures =

Village in Essex, England

Coordinates: 51.95°N 0.767°E

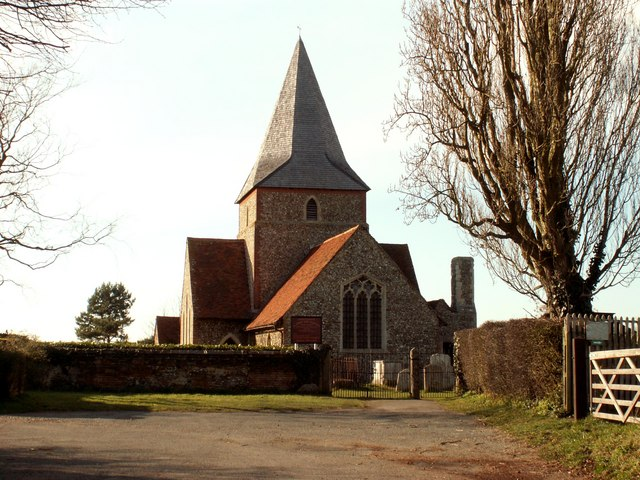
- St. John's church, Mount Bures

- Location within Essex
- Population: 218 (Parish, 2021)
- Civil parish: Mount Bures
- District: Colchester
- Shire county: Essex
- Region: East
- Country: England
- Sovereign state: United Kingdom
- Post town: Bures
- Postcode district: CO8
- UK Parliament: Harwich and North Essex

Mount Bures is a small village and civil parish in the City of Colchester district of Essex, England. It adjoins the county boundary with Suffolk. At the 2021 census the parish had a population of 218.

It takes its name from the mount or motte believed to have been built shortly after the invasion by William the Conqueror in 1066.

The Gainsborough railway line that runs through the village is believed to have been opened in 1848. A few miles down the line from Mount Bures is the Chappel Viaduct. The Thatchers Arms in Mount Bures was thought to have become a brewhouse or public house to quench the thirst of the navvies working on the railway line and the viaduct in the late 1840s.

A bunker from the Colchester Stop Line, a series of bunkers built during World War II, can be found at Mount Bures.

Sergeants Orchard is a nature reserve managed by the Essex Wildlife Trust south of the village.
