= H. Kempton Dyson =

English structural engineer, civil engineer, architect, editor and author

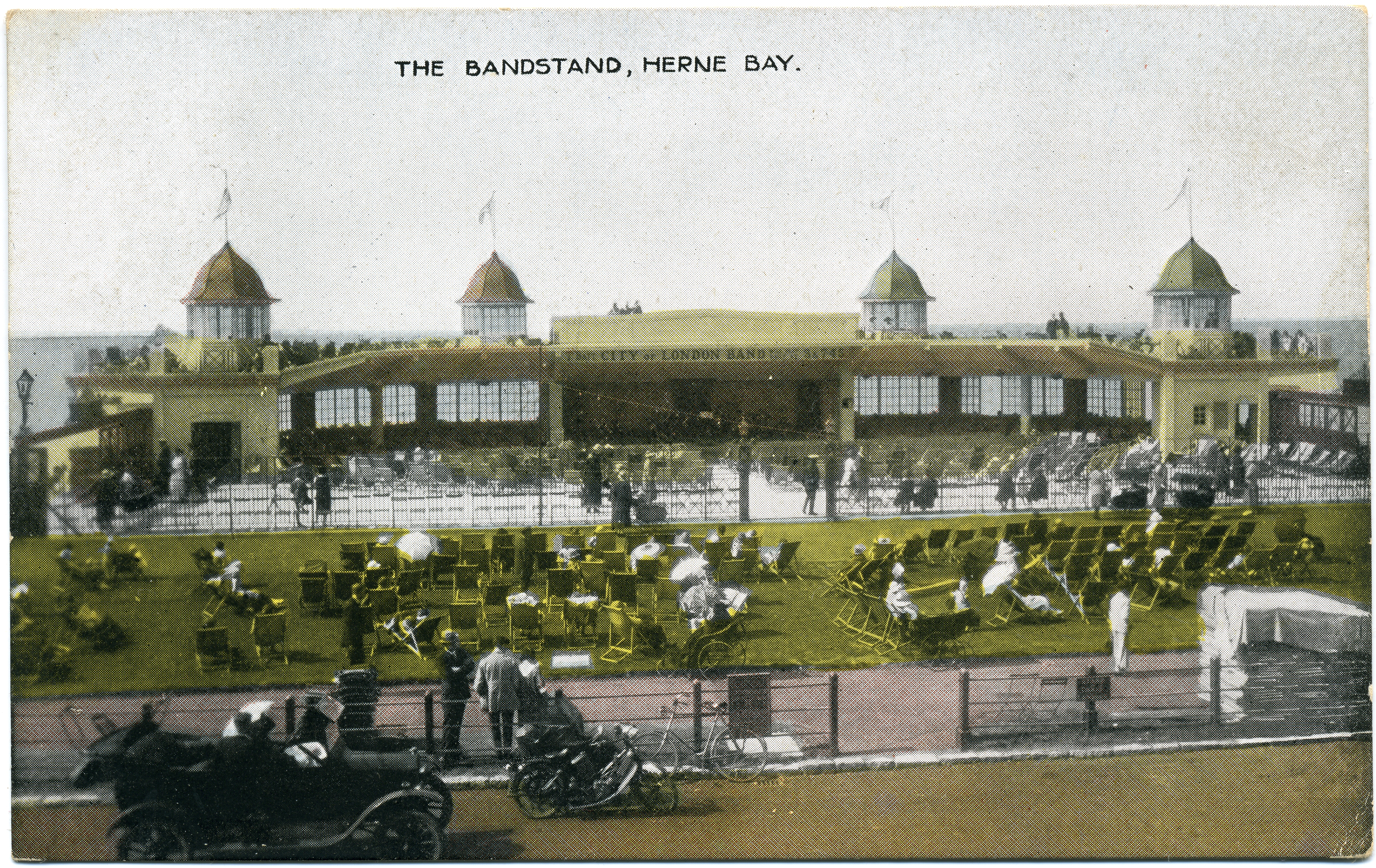
- Central Bandstand, Herne Bay, 1924
- Born: 24 January 1880; Stratford, London, England
- Died: 15 January 1944 (aged 63); Kensington, London, England
- Citizenship: Great Britain
- Spouse: Nellie Cooper (b.1886)
- Children: Norman Kempton Dyson (1910–1975)
- Parent(s): Wiliam Franklin Dyson (1853–1918); Edith Blyth Kempton (1857–1905)
- Engineering career
- Discipline: structural, civil, architect
- Institutions: Associate member Institution of Civil Engineers (1908); Member of Institution of Structural Engineers (1917)
- Practice name: H. Kempton Dyson
- Significant design: Central Bandstand, Herne Bay (1924)
- Awards: Bronze Medal of Concrete Institute (1922)

Herbert William Charles Kempton Dyson, M.I.Struct.E. (1880–1944), known professionally as H. Kempton Dyson, was an English structural engineer, civil engineer, architect, editor and author who specialised in reinforced concrete structures. He was a founder member and the first permanent secretary of the Concrete Institute, which became the Institution of Structural Engineers. He designed the Central Bandstand, Herne Bay in 1924.

== Background ==
=== Ancestry ===
Dyson's paternal grandfather was William Farrell Dyson of Great Yarmouth (1823–1886), who married Mary Ann Franklin (1826–1891) at Great Yarmouth in 1852. Dyson's maternal grandfather was Green Kempton (1824–1885) of Cambridge who married Eliza Campion in Cambridge in 1845.

Dyson's father was architect William Franklin Dyson who was born in Great Yarmouth, 1853, and died in Edmonton, 1918. His mother was Edith Blyth Kempton who was born in Cambridge, 1857, and died in Wandsworth, 1905. His parents married in Cambridge on 23 January 1879.

=== Life history ===
He was born on 24 January 1880 in Stratford, and was baptised in the same year at All Saints Church, Cambridge. He was his parents' only son. By 1881 he was living at 126 Upper Kennington Lane, Lambeth, and by 1901 he was in south-west Battersea. In Hackney in 1909 he married Nellie Cooper, only daughter of George Cooper; she was born in Germany in 1886. By 1911 at the age of 31 Dyson was calling himself Herbert Kempton Dyson, he was listed as secretary of the Concrete Institute and was living with his wife in Richmond. In 1924 he was living at 17 Warwick Square, London SW1. He died at home, at no.3 De Vere Gardens, Kensington on 15 January 1944 aged 63 years, and was described in his Times obituary paragraph as a registered architect and chartered structural engineer, and as the "beloved husband of Nellie Kempton Dyson".

Herbert and Nellie had a son, Norman Kempton Dyson, born in Richmond, 1910. Norman married Betty L. Way in Kensington, 1936, and became a flying officer on 11 May 1941 during World War II. He died in Norwich in 1975.

== Career ==
Dyson had special expertise in reinforced concrete structures. He is described in Who Was Who as "an architect and consulting civil engineer; specialist in structural engineering, especially reinforced concrete and steel construction." When the Concrete Institute was founded in 1908, he was 28 years old and an Associate Member of the Institution of Civil Engineers. Between 1908 and 1917 he held the post of Secretary of the Concrete Institute. In May 1910 he became the first permanent secretary at £200 per year, and although he was allowed to undertake journalistic work in office hours and employ a typist at £1 per week, he had to remain within the office between 10.00 am and 6.00 pm on weekdays. In 1917 he resigned as secretary and was elected to membership; he served on its council between 1921 and 1922. In 1922 he was awarded the bronze medal of the Concrete Institute for his paper entitled "What is the Use of the Modular Ratio?" He assisted in the founding of the Institute and its 1922 development into the Institution of Structural Engineers. Besides serving on most of its committees during his career he was honorary editor of its journal, The Structural Engineer in 1923, and was honorary secretary of the Institute 1924–1925.

From 1922 to 1923 he was editor of The Builders' Journal and Architectural Engineer, which later became The Architects' Journal, and of Specification from 1904 to 1908. He was a Registered Architect, a past member of the British Joint Committee on Reinforced Concrete and Hon. Secretary of the Conference on the London Steel-Frame Act (enacted as the LCC (General Powers) Act 1909). In 1910 he was sent to Paris by the Concrete Institute as part of a deputation to study the durability of reinforced concrete, looking at bridges, tunnels, culverts, reservoirs and other buildings including one designed by François Coignet in 1852. In 1914 he took part in an international investigation into reinforced concrete accidents.

On 2 February 1926 a creditor filed a petition for bankruptcy against him, and a receiving order was declared against him on 2 March. At this time he was a consulting engineer and conducting business at 17 Warwick Square, Westminster, London WC1.

== Designs and projects ==
He has been described as the "designer of numerous structures of many kinds." This section lists some of those designs.

=== Up to 1913 ===
In 1910 he designed a new system of floor construction, and in 1913 he designed adjustable beam forms, which were reinforced concrete beams for electric travelling cranes to run on (1913).

=== World War I ===
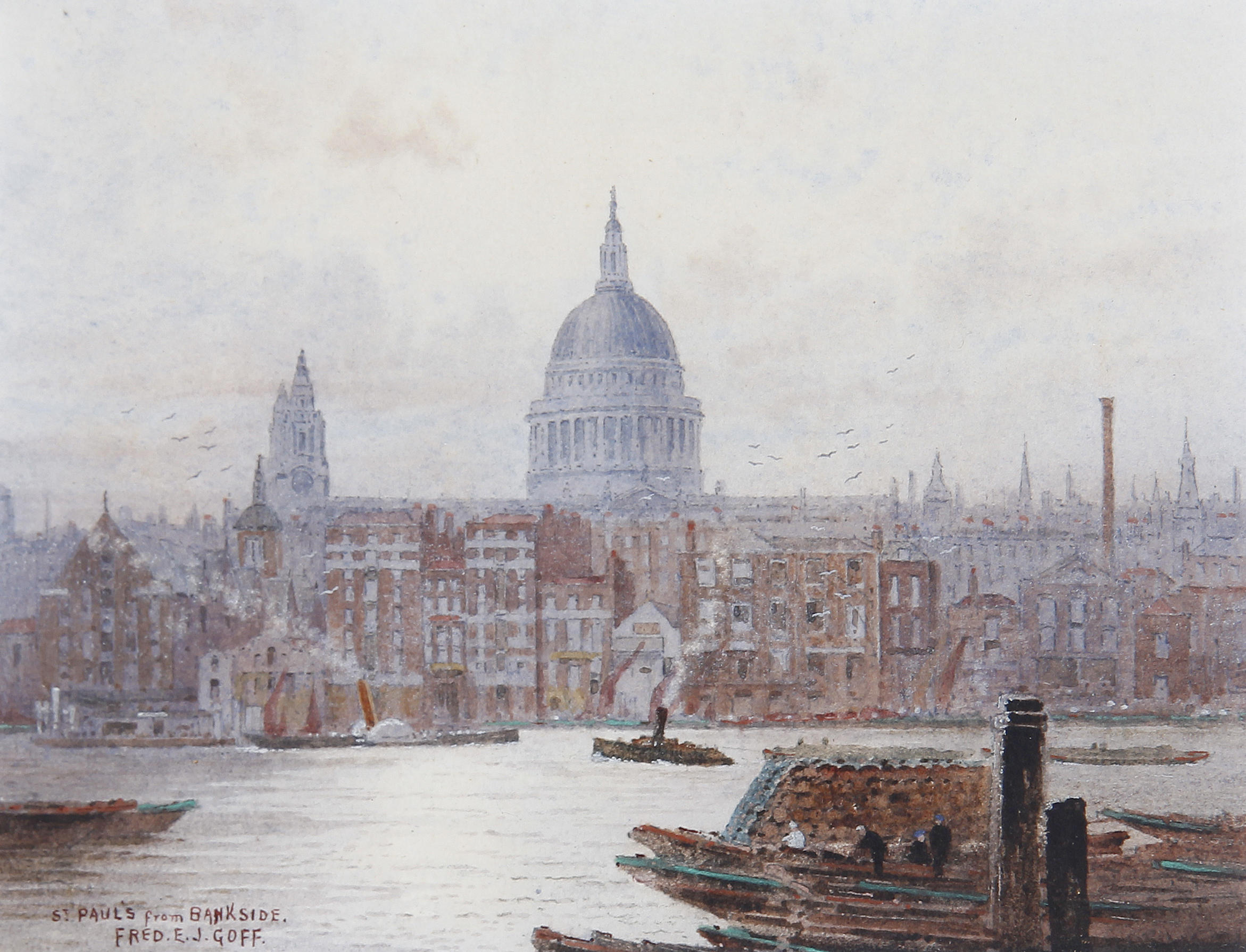
Dome of St Paul's Cathedral

At some time between 1914 and 1918 he was employed to design reinforced concrete slipways for flying boats, and was consulting Engineer for Works of strengthening supports for the dome at St Paul's Cathedral. In 1918 he designed a Water tower for Royal Naval Air Service at Killeagh, Cork.

=== From 1919 ===
==== Central Bandstand, Herne Bay ====
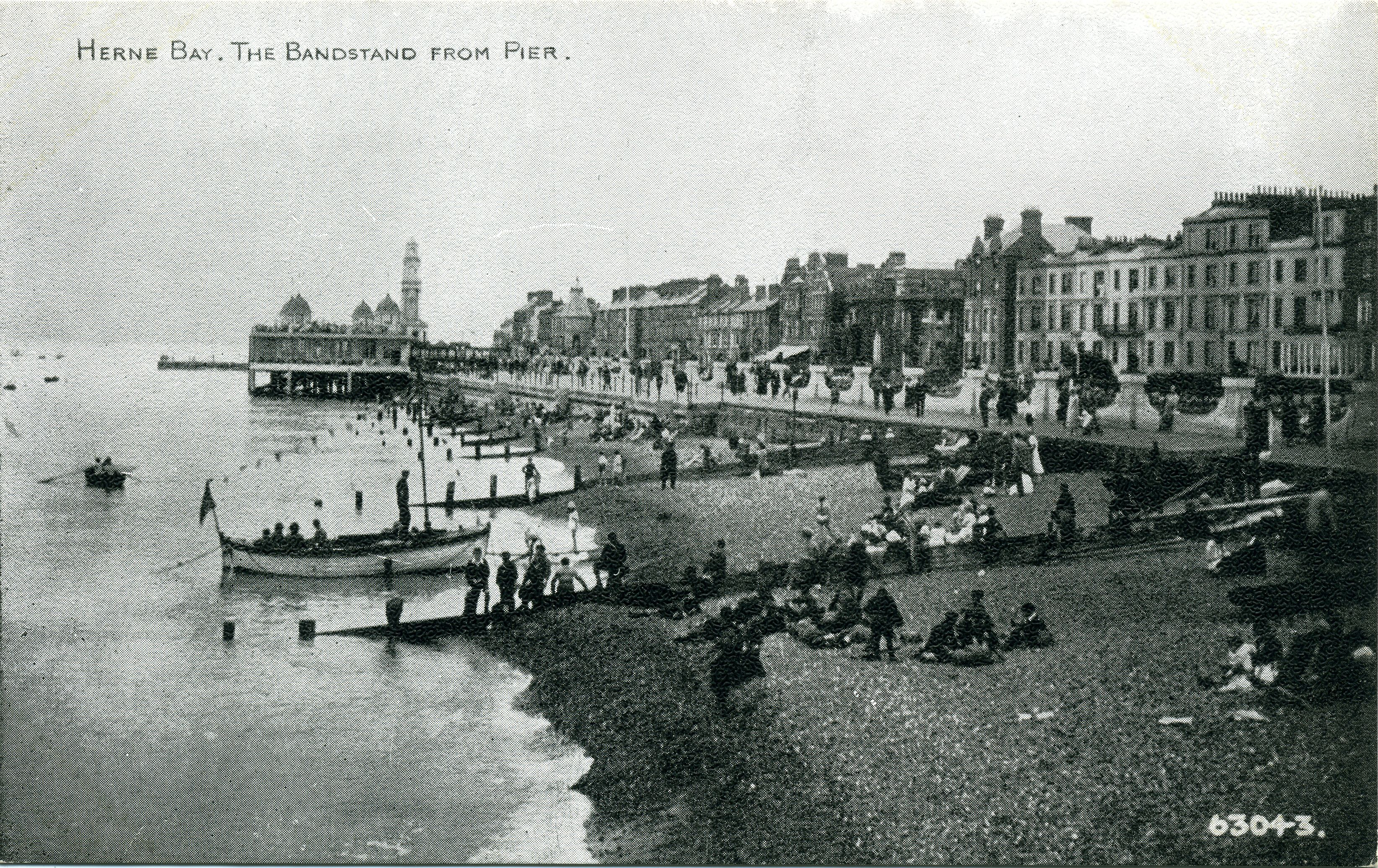
Central Bandstand, 1920s, showing columns above tidal beach

In 1923–1924 he designed the first phase of this bandstand as one of the earliest reinforced concrete structures of its kind in the UK. It was supported above the tidal beach on concrete pillars sheathed in cast iron, so that it was level with the promenade. Its cantilevered roof supported seaward-facing balconies with space for deckchairs, and sheltered both a lower deck and the stage. Metal, glazed screens at the east and west sides of the building crossed the promenade, and could be moved to protect the audience from wind, or retracted into the wings to allow promenaders to cross when no band was playing. The seating area in front of the stage was a railed-off section of the promenade, and the seating on the roof above the stage included two copper-covered domes, plus two domes which doubled as refreshment kiosks. In the 1920s and 1930s the conductor of a visiting military band was considered a VIP, therefore a red carpet would be laid across the road so that he could make his grand entrance from the Connaught Hotel opposite the Bandstand.

==== Cavendish House ====
Between 1927 and 1928 he designed the alteration of Cavendish House, no. 32 Old Burlington Street, Mayfair, City of Westminster, London W1S, to create a new fifth storey for a picture gallery, and to rearrange space for shops on the ground floor.

==== Rue de Courseulles Sur Mer, Dartmouth ====
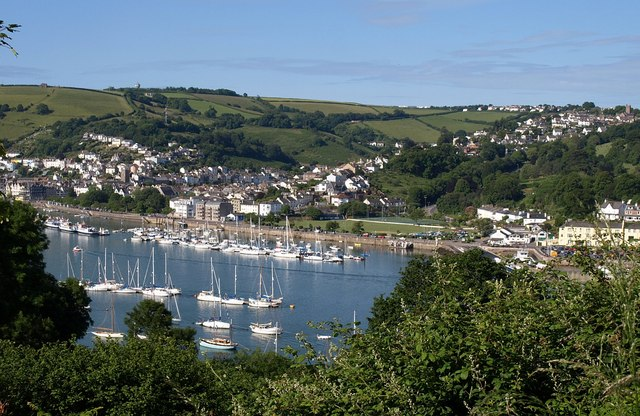
Road constructed by Dyson and Pimm 1929: image centre, between river and field

This project was originally called the Coombe Improvements Scheme. In the spring of 1929, Dyson teamed up with fellow consulting engineer Gower B. R. Pimm to design a road over river mud at Dartmouth. It was described by The Times as "an engineering feat". It was a piece of road intended to connect Dartmouth's North Embankment of the River Dart with the Dartmouth-Torquay road, thus easing traffic between Plymouth and Torquay. It was to become the Rue de Courseulles Sur Mer, part of the A379, and the estuary mud behind the road was later reclaimed as a leisure facility. A 30 ft carriageway and two 10 ft footpaths gave the road a 50 ft width.

A retaining wall protected it from the river, and piles 20–45 ft long, each weighing four tons and driven in rows of three, prevented the road from sinking into mud, although these were not needed for about 200 ft at each end: foundations were shallower so that hard core and a reinforced concrete containing wall were used there. Beneath the middle 200 yards, the rock foundation was at a great depth under the mud, so the reinforced concrete road was built on an open viaduct over about 200 reinforced concrete piles and supported by reinforced concrete trestles made of columns, beams and bracings. Although the new leisure area behind the road would be filled with hard core and soil, and similar filling would be placed below the viaduct, the road on its viaduct could be used early on, with no need to worry about initial subsidence of the filling. The river-side of the embankment was faced with a reinforced concrete curtain wall, built by suspending precast, properly cured, reinforced concrete L-shaped units from the top of the viaduct's trestle. The prefabrication and use of a crane cut tidal work to a minimum.

== Publications and papers ==
- "Cheap cottages and the exhibition (1905) at Letchworth'". Part I, Architectural Review vol. 18, 1905, p. 108–115.
- "Cheap cottages and the exhibition (1905) at Letchworth". Part II, Architectural Review, vol. 18, 1905, p. 154–169.
- Concrete Block Making in Great Britain (1908–1909)
- The everyday uses of Portland cement (1909)
- Reinforced Concrete Bins (1910)
- "History and Development of Reinforced Concrete" (1910) in Concrete and Constructional Engineering vol V, 1910, nos. 1 to 12
- Reinforced Concrete Design Simplified. Diagrams, tables, and other data for designing and checking accurately and speedily by John Charles Gammon and H. Kempton Dyson (1911), London, C. Lockwood & Son
- "Shear and problems arising therefrom" (1913)
- "London's reinforced concrete regulations: a constructive criticism, part I" (1913) in Concrete and Constructional Engineering, VOL. VIII. 1913. Nos. 1 to 12, published at North British and Mercantile Building, Waterloo, Place, London, S.W.
- "London's reinforced concrete regulations: a constructive criticism, part II" (1914) in "Concrete and Constructional Engineering", vol IX 1914.
- "Slender struts" (1914) in "Concrete and Constructional Engineering", vol IX 1914.
- "Reform of building by-laws" in Journal of the Institute of Municipal and County Engineers, March 1915 p. 6.
- "Shear and problems arising therefrom" (1915) in Concrete and Constructional Engineering, vol. X, nos 1–12.
- "New materials and methods as influencing design" (paper, 1917)
- "Shear and problems arising therefrom" (1918) in The Structural Engineer vol. 6, Issue 1.
- "Tests on high-tension steels in reinforced concrete design" (1921) in Concrete and Constructional Engineering, vol. XVI, 1921, nos 1–12.
- "What is the use of the modular ratio?" (1921–1922) in Concrete and Constructional Engineering, Vol 17, nos 5, 6 and 7, London May–July 1922, pp. 330–36, 408–15, 486–91.
- "Stresses in Beams" (1923) in The Structural Engineer vol. 1, Issue 12.

== Lectures ==
On 27 September 1910, Dyson introduced an educational course with a lecture, using lantern slides, called "Instruction in reinforced concrete: a special category" at the London County Council School of Building, now London South Bank University. The course followed in the winter of the same year, and was entitled "Reinforced concrete: practice and design". In November and December 1913 he gave six lectures on "Reinforced concrete: its commercial development and practical application" at the Concrete Institute, Denison House, 296 Vauxhall Bridge Road, Westminster.

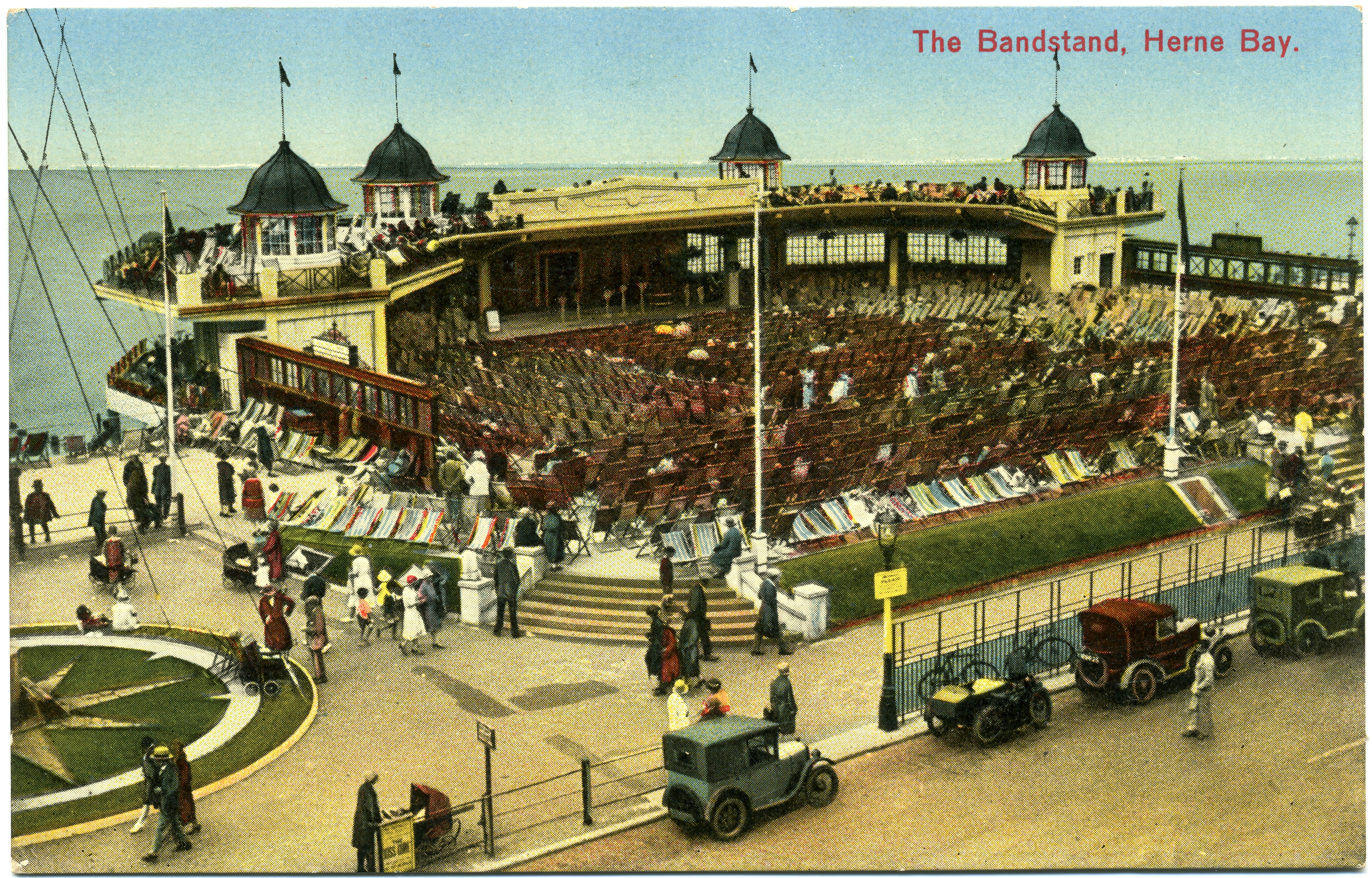
Central Bandstand, 1920s
