= De Vere Mews =

Mews houses in London

Coordinates: 51.499811°N 0.184528°W

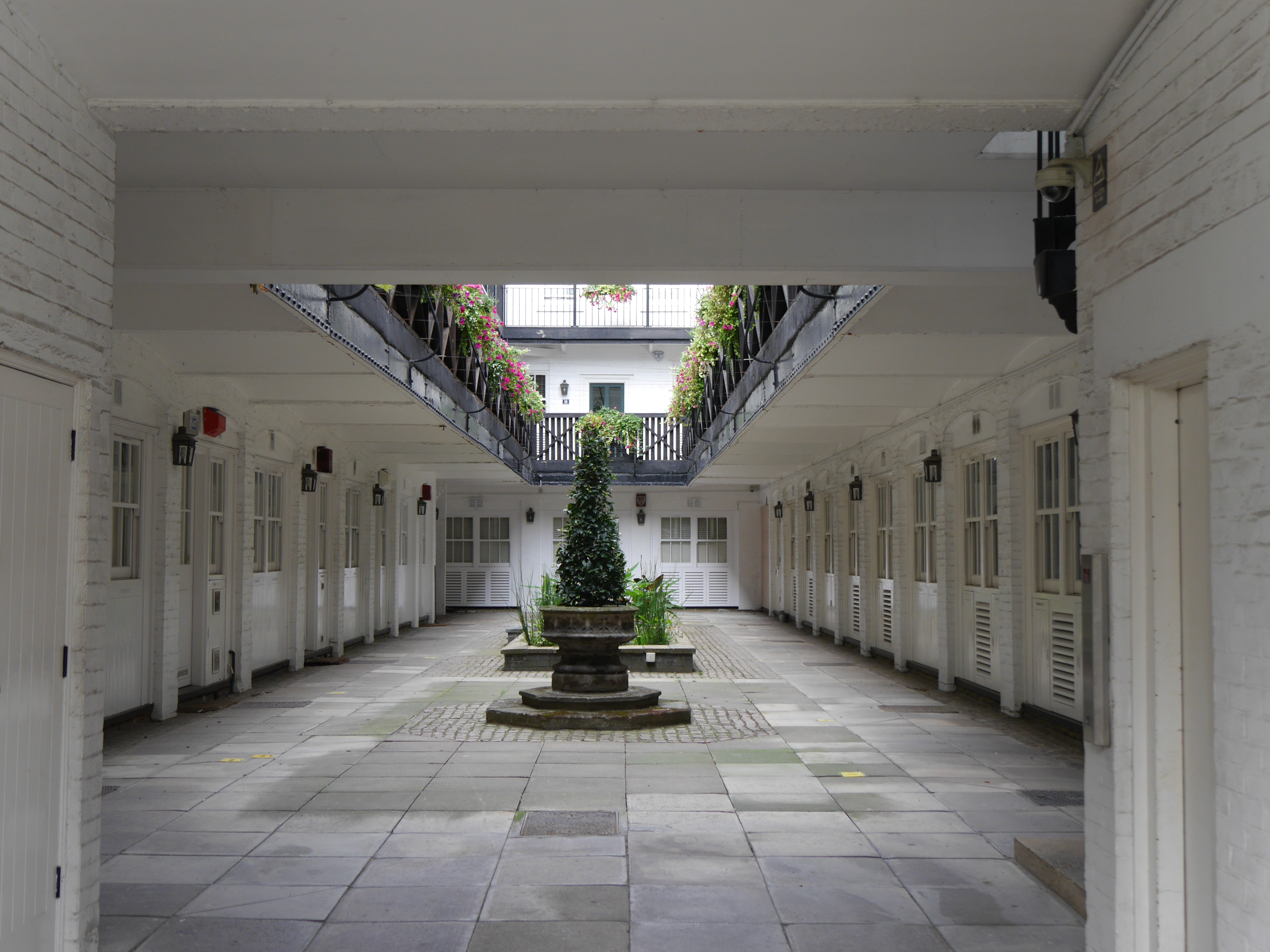
De Vere Mews, 2016

De Vere Mews consists of 18 Grade II listed mews houses in Kensington, London W8, probably built in the mid-19th century.

De Vere Mews lies to the rear of the southern end of the east side of De Vere Gardens, and is entered via Canning Place.
