= Central Bandstand, Herne Bay =

Central Bandstand
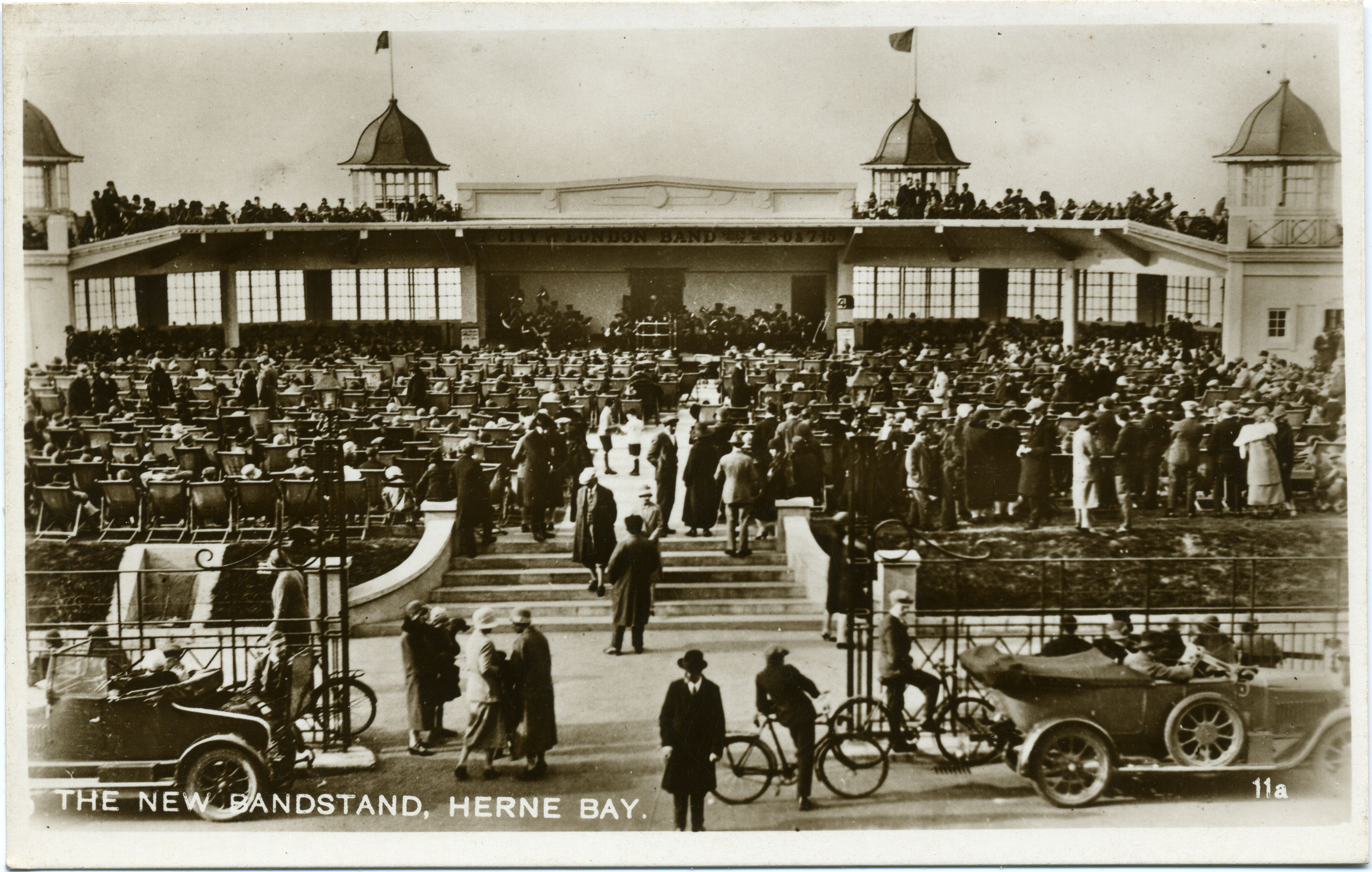
- The Central Bandstand in 1925
- Interactive map of the Central Bandstand area

General information
- Type: Performance venue
- Architectural style: Art deco
- Location: Sea front, Central Parade, CT6 5JN, Herne Bay, Kent, England
- Coordinates: 51.3726°N 1.1242°E
- Completed: 1st phase 1924; 2nd phase 1932
- Renovated: 1998–1999
- Cost: £3,100 (2nd phase)
- Landlord: City of Canterbury

Technical details
- Structural system: Reinforced Concrete

Design and construction
- Architect: H. Kempton Dyson
- Structural engineer: H. Kempton Dyson

Website
- Tripadvisor.co.uk: Central Banstand

The Central Bandstand, known as the Bandstand, in Herne Bay, Kent, England, was designed by H. Kempton Dyson in 1924, extended with an Art Deco frontage in 1932, and refurbished between 1998 and 1999. It is one of the coastal landmarks of the town. When first built, it was a popular venue for visiting military band concerts and for tea dances. Edwina Mountbatten spoke there on behalf of the Red Cross in 1939. In the 1920s and 1930s a red carpet would be laid across the road and up to the stage for the conductor of the brass band to walk from the Connaught Hotel which was directly opposite the Bandstand.

== Location and construction ==
The Central Bandstand with its 1932 frontage has been described as an Art Deco landmark, and one of the first reinforced concrete structures in the UK. It straddles the beach and Central Parade just east of the Clock Tower. The back or seaward half, built in 1924, was originally supported above the beach on concrete pillars sheathed in cast iron, so that the stage was level with the main thoroughfare. The tide used to go in and out under the building until at least the 1950s. During World War II when the Pier was out of bounds, anglers were permitted to fish from the rooftop balcony. As of 2013 the beach has risen so that the piers are no longer visible and the sea has receded away from the Bandstand.

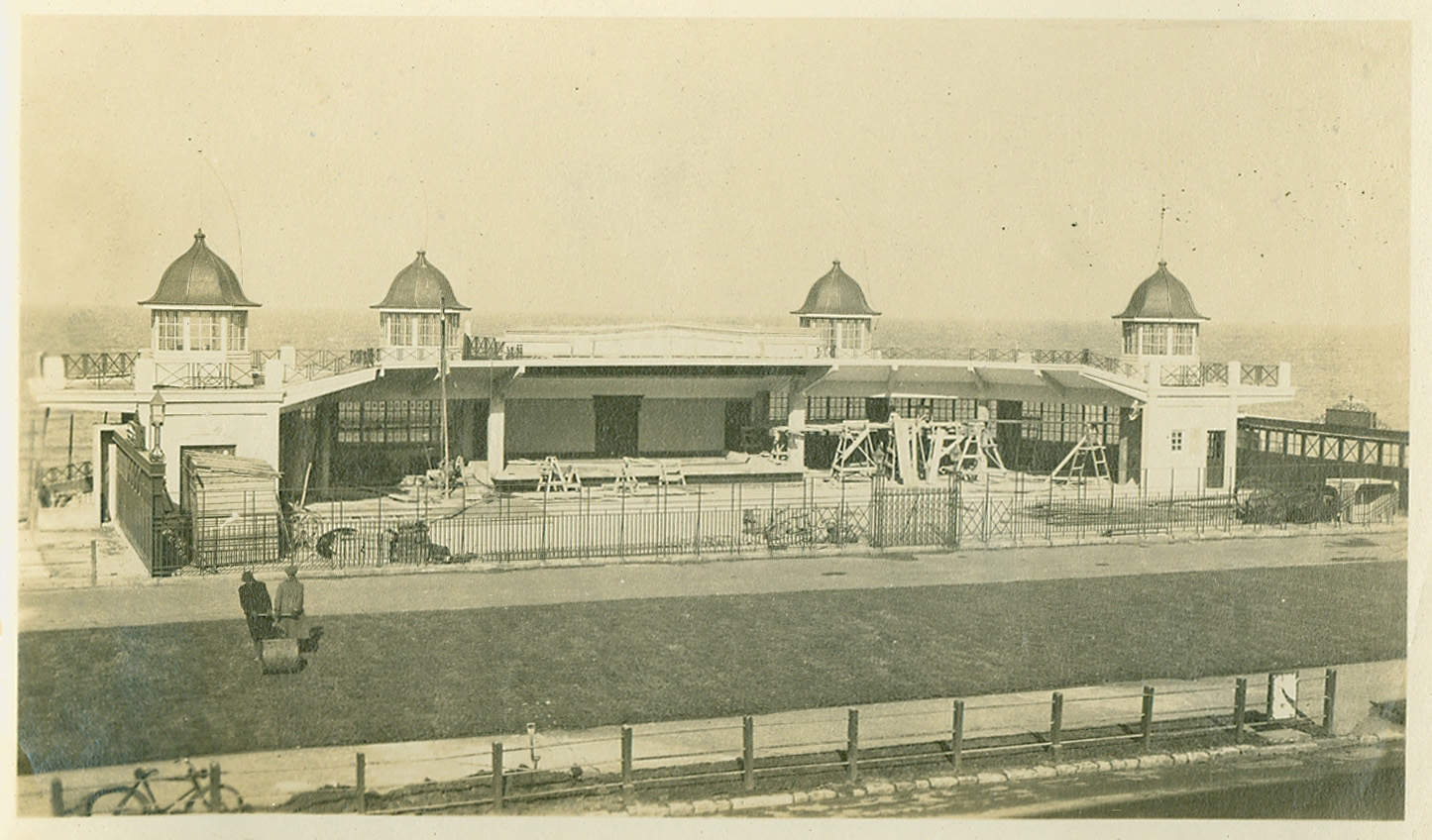
In process of construction, 1924

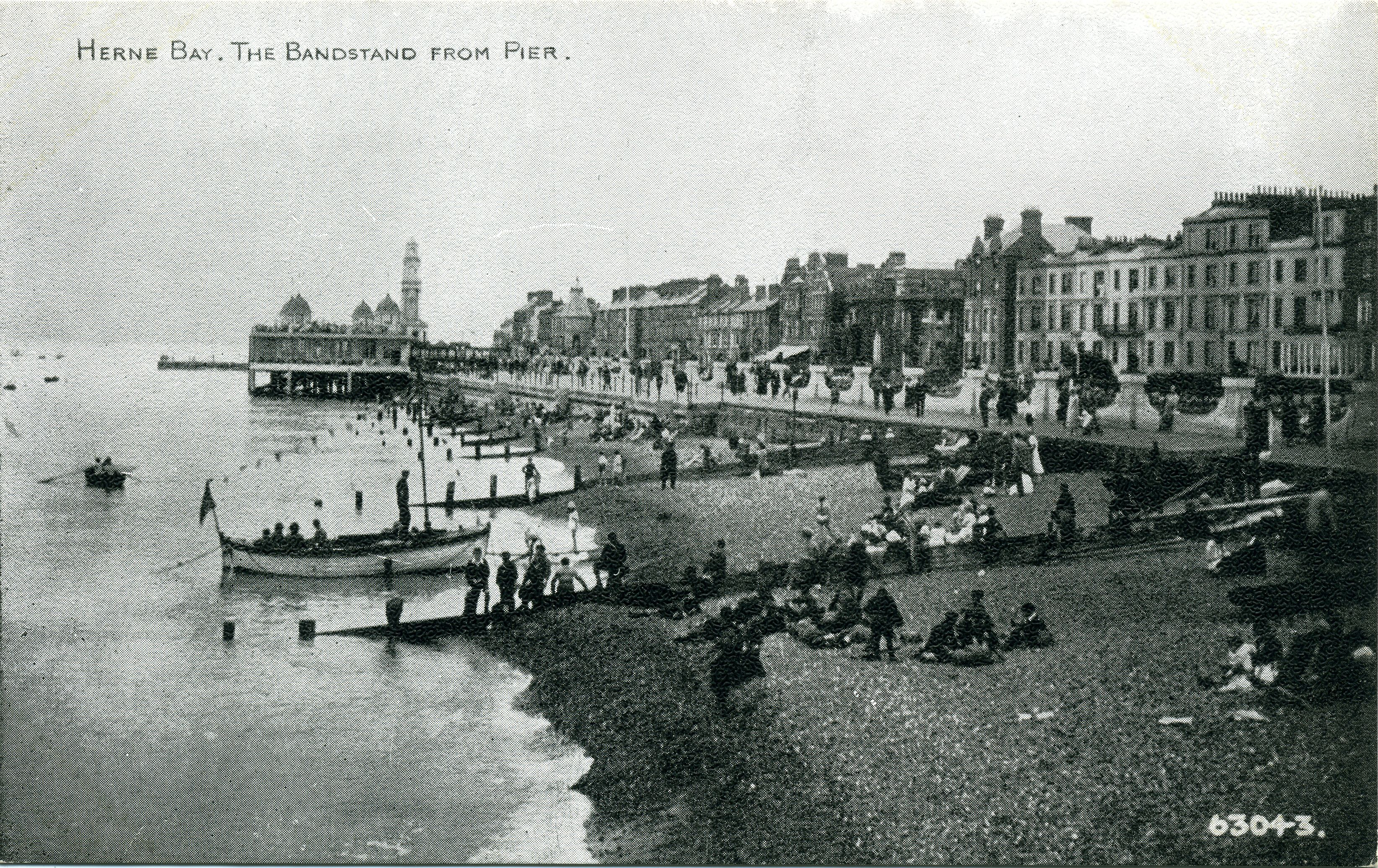
Piers supporting bandstand visible above beach, 1920s

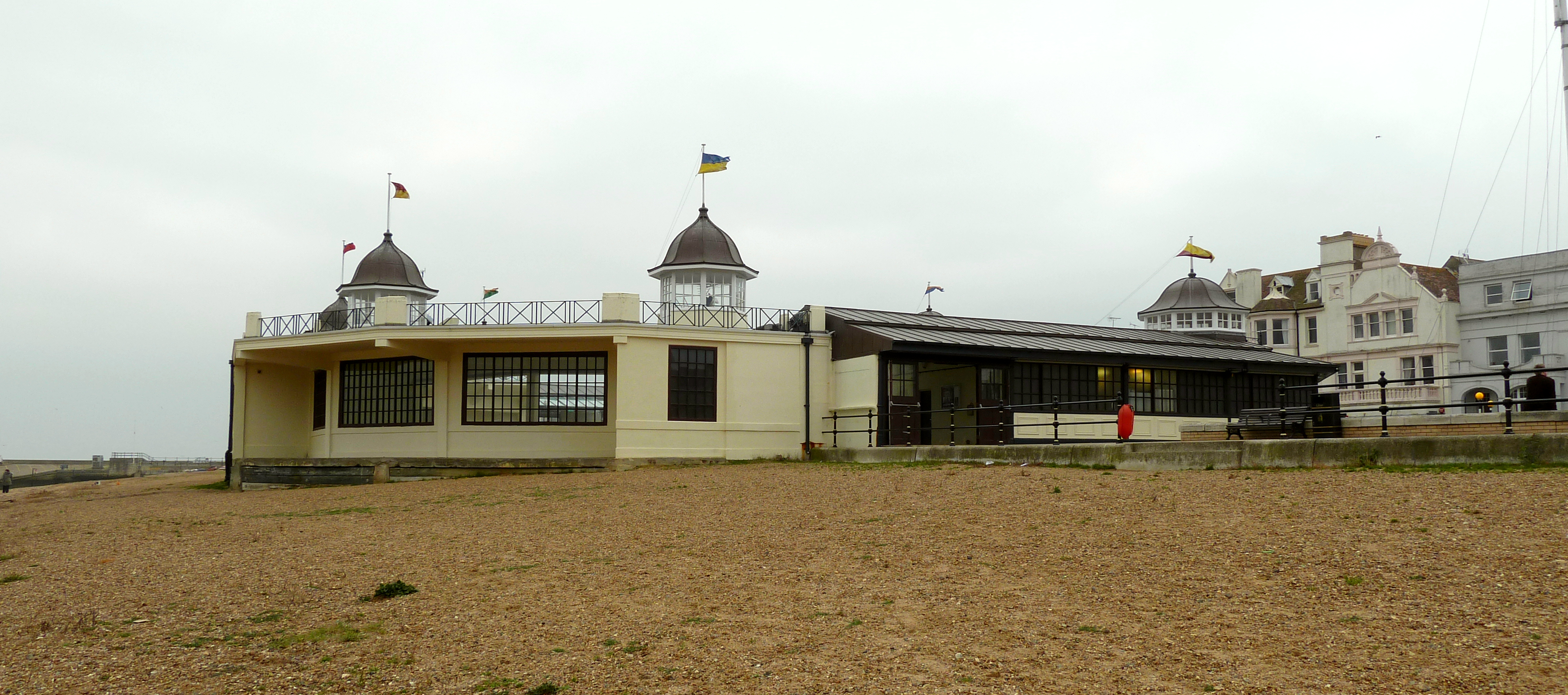
Piers hidden below risen beach in 2013

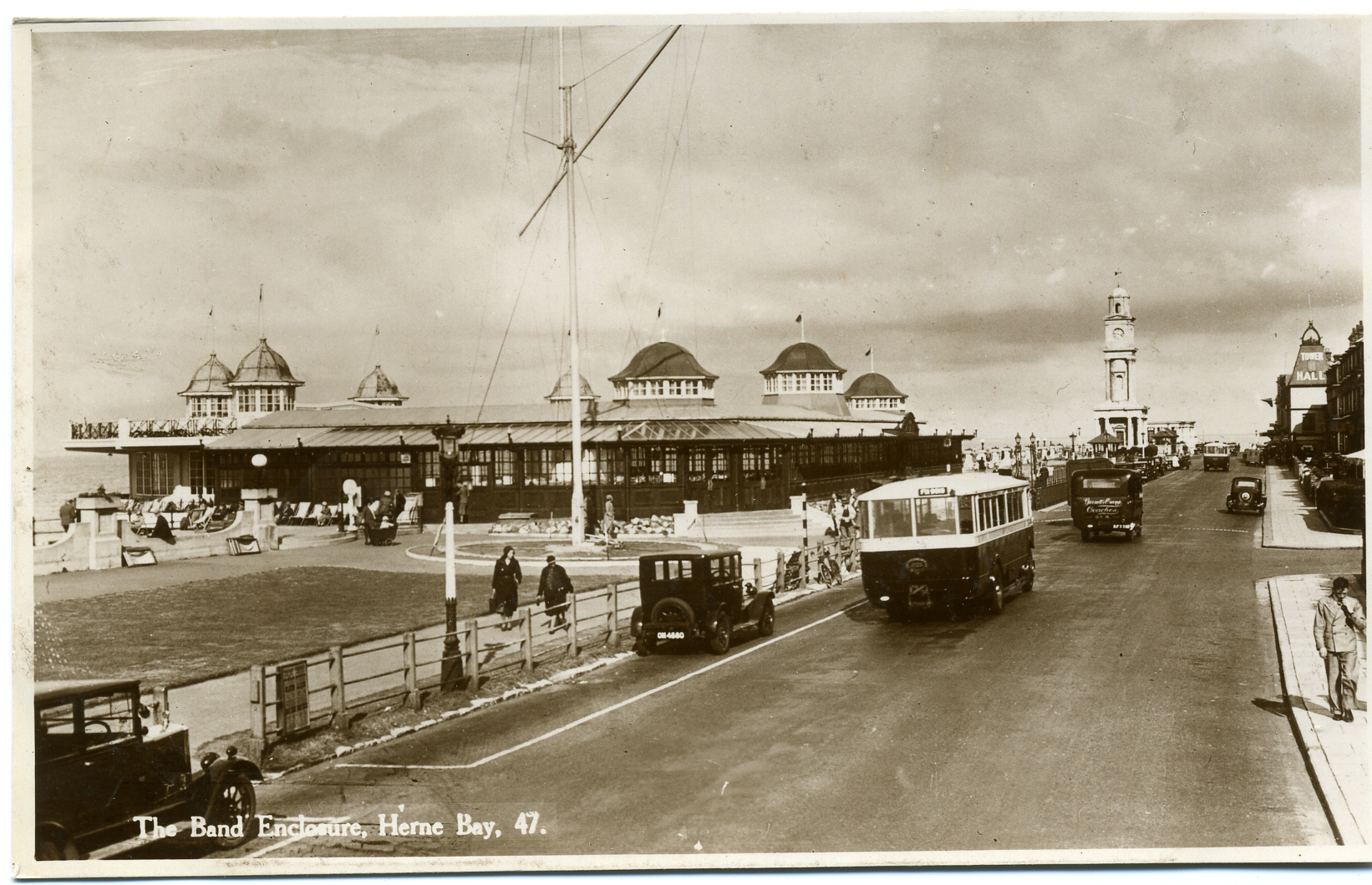
With frontage, 1939

It was first called the New Bandstand, and then the Central Bandstand, to differentiate it from other bandstands in Herne Bay, especially the bandstand which stood on the roof of the King's Hall and has since been demolished. The north or seaward side of the Central Bandstand was built in 1924, with alterations in 1931. The original architect was Herbert Kempton Dyson, M.I.Struct.E (1880–1944), who was a founder member of the Concrete Institute, and specialised in reinforced concrete structures. The 1924 section has two outside seaward-facing balconies with space for deckchairs, including a cantilevered roof for the lower deck and for covering the stage inside. Metal, glazed screens at the east and west sides of the building crossed the promenade, and could be moved to protect the audience from wind, or retracted into the wings to allow promenaders to cross when no band was playing. The seating area was a railed-off section of the promenade, and the seating on the roof above the stage included two copper-covered domes, plus two domes which doubled as refreshment kiosks. The roof is now inaccessible for safety reasons. By the late 1920s the audience area in front of the stage had extended across Tower Gardens to the edge of the footpath and road.

The frontage, built of steel, cast iron, glass and teak and leaving the centre roofless, was built in 1932 at a cost of £3,100 to accommodate up to 1,000 people and was opened by the Royal Artillery Band. Contemporary drawings indicate that plans were under consideration to roof over the whole building, but that never happened.

=== Damage, closure and restoration ===
The structure was damaged in the gale, heavy seas and North Sea flood of 1953 and became weaker during ensuing years. By the 1970s it had fallen into disuse. By 1974 the piles over the beach were corroded, and this led to the northern half of the interior being closed to the public in 1975. In 1977 it had become dangerous to walk beneath the glass awning inside the building, and stones in rough seas had smashed the windows at the back; some window frames had come away. Concrete and iron pillars in the 1924 section had split, guttering had rusted and there was smashed glass on the floor, rotten woodwork and detached light-bulb holders. The building had a "keep clear, dangerous structure" notice on it. The assistant city architect Jed Baker said there had been insufficient funds for regular surveys and maintenance. Councillor Arthur Porter wanted to demolish the building but Cllr Dick Peard and 13 others wanted it restored.

Clipperview Ltd was granted a 20-year lease of the building in early 1987 and successfully provided entertainment for the summer, then in October the Great storm of 1987 damaged the roof. Clipperview was obliged to undertake restorations in 1988 at a cost of £25,000. The kitchen and restaurant were improved, and heating installed in the lavatories. However the restorations were not completed, and in 1990 the Council took legal action. The reinforced concrete had corroded and cracked with sections working loose, cast-iron work and steel beams were corroded and the building was vandalised; the council could undertake only minor remedial work during the legal dispute. Between 1992 and 1998 the Bandstand was empty, in need of repair and closed to the public. In 1995 the Council briefly lost possession of the Bandstand due to a Court dispute concerning Clipperview. The building was formally returned to the town in August of that year and has since remained under control of the council.

On 23 September 1994 and in November 1995, City of Canterbury councillors met to decide whether to demolish the whole building at a cost of £275,000, retain just the original 1924 seaward side or refurbish the whole building at £300,000 plus future maintenance costs. The walls, roof, floors, steelwork, railings and turrets were in need of repair; then new glazed windows, redecoration and a new sea wall would be required.

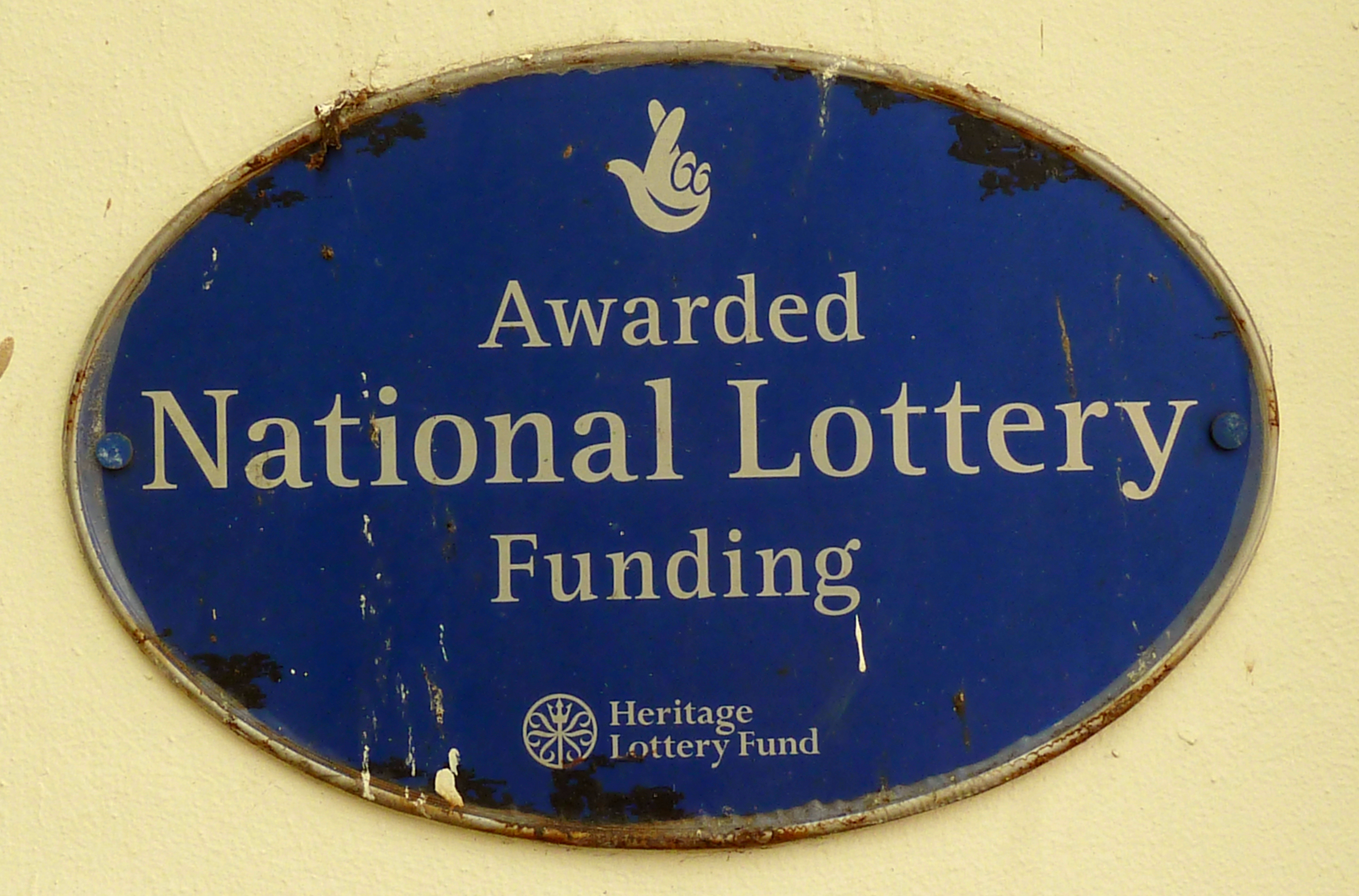
Lottery plaque on Bandstand

The Green Party at Herne Bay supported a renovation scheme. English Heritage said:

"The bandstand is critical to Herne Bay, being a prominent focal point . . .It is of immense historic importance to the history of Herne Bay . . . there should be a presumption in favour of retaining unlisted buildings which make a positive contribution to the character of a conservation area."

English Heritage suggested that the Secretary of State would object to the demolition, and that there was a good chance of a successful application to the Heritage Lottery Fund for assistance with repairs. A readers' opinion poll of the Herne Bay Gazette supported retention and restoration of the building, and local Liberal Democrats organised a petition calling for full restoration. A public exhibition of the sorry state of the building and of demolition and repair options took place at the Bandstand; the poll associated with this received a strong public response in favour of renovation. The Council agreed to renovate the building, but work was delayed from 1996 due to budget cuts. In 1997 Whitbread considered investing £1 million to convert the building to a pub-restaurant, then suddenly withdrew from the scheme. The building was refurbished between 1998 and May 1999 with the help of £340,000 lottery money awarded in 1997, although by 1998 the estimated total cost had risen to £962,000 due to "considerable unforeseen damage".

During renovation by W.W. Martin of Ramsgate, the original cast-iron panels were shotblasted and the teak window frames dipped and stripped. New public lavatories were installed. Interior glass screens could not be saved but were reproduced in clear and green glass. Side doors were opened to allow the seafront promenade to continue through the open-air centre of the building. The 1924 stage area was restored to original condition with screened windows looking out to sea, and the wooden cupolas rebuilt with additional copper panels on top. The building was reopened for entertainment on 3 July 1999, followed by the official opening on 8 October.

A condition of the 1997 lottery funding was that the building would be used for non-commercial activity, but by 2008 the council was offering it for rent.

== History ==
=== Early days from 1920s to World War II ===
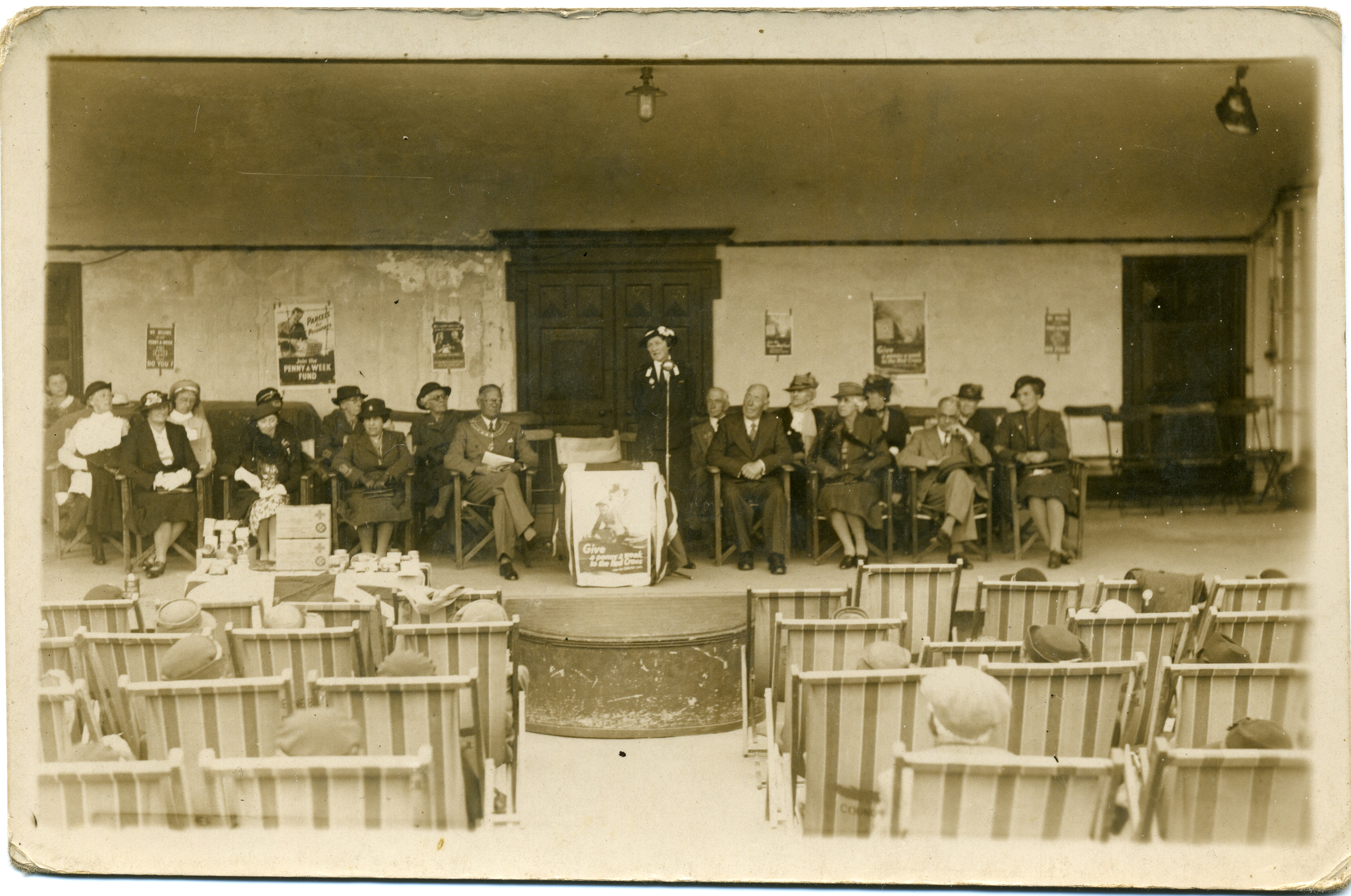
Edwina Mountbatten at the Bandstand, 1939

The northern section was opened in April 1924 by Lord Morris (1859–1935), member of the House of Lords and previous premier of Newfoundland. The southern frontage was opened on a Sunday shortly before Easter, 1932 by the High Sheriff of Kent Major Sir John Theodore Prestige. Callender's Cableworks Band (1898–1961) performed at the ceremony. Before the Bandstand was built, bands such as the 6th Dragoon Guards would give concerts around the flagstaff which is situated just to the west of the present bandstand. When first built, the Central Bandstand consisted only of what is now the north or seaward side, with stage, turreted side wings and an outdoor area to the north for the audience in deck chairs; the area was available for deck chairs until the 1970s. Visiting bands and school bands played there. For example, the Royal Warwickshire Band visited in 1925. In those days a red carpet would be laid for the conductor to walk across from the Connaught Hotel which was and is, as of 2013, directly opposite the Bandstand. The Reverend Daubeney at Herne used to arrange for his sermons to finish in time to allow the congregation to catch the bus to Herne Bay for the evening Bandstand concert. This venue was so popular in 1927 that queues could stretch as far as the Pier, and crowds were often turned away.

In the 1920s there were children's talent competitions, magicians then known as conjurers, and Punch and Judy shows. On 26 and 27 November 1932 a gale caused waves to break over the sea wall, flooding buildings and throwing up tons of shingle: "The heavy doors of the central bandstand were torn from their hinges and many windows were broken." Around 1939, Edwina Mountbatten, speaking on behalf of the Red Cross at the Bandstand, appealed on behalf of prisoners taken at the beginning of World War II.

=== Later years ===
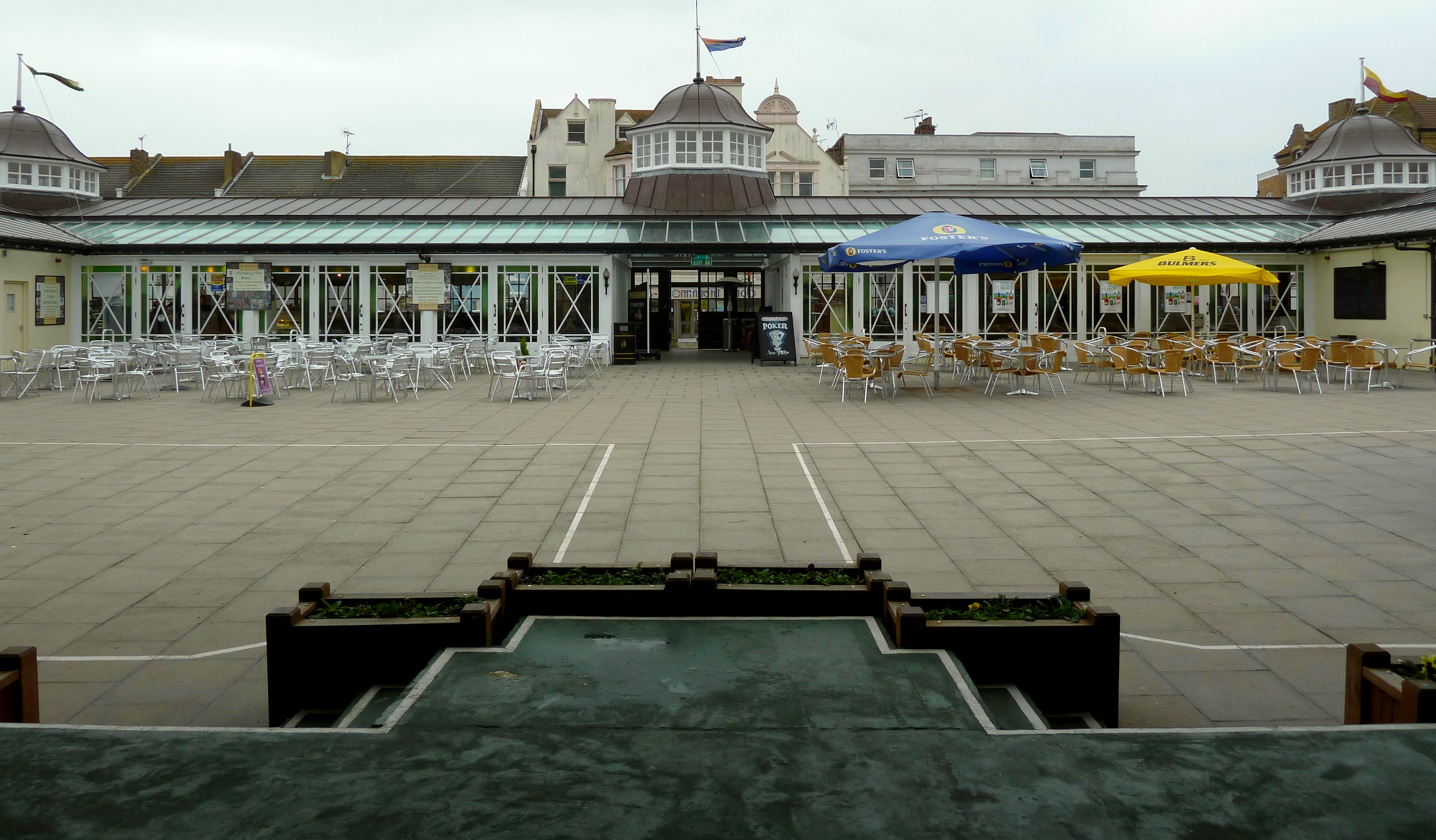
View from stage, 2013

In January 1987 Clipperview leased and renovated the building then reopened it in April, with Margate Majorettes and Whitstable Brass performing. The Herne Bay Visitor Information Centre was located in the south-east corner of the building from 1988 until the end of 2008; it was relocated to Council offices in Canterbury in January 2009. As a consequence of the closure, the Herne Bay Times said that "Lily, the 12ft Herne Bay giant, and Belle, her 15ft friend, have been made homeless." It is not known what these artefacts were. By 2000 skateboarders, rollerbladers and cyclists had damaged the stage, and had been banned from the building. As of 2013 the front of the building hosted a bandstand cafe bar and an Indian restaurant called the Maharajah. In 2009 Makcari's coffee lounge and ice cream parlour took over the vacant space left by the information centre.

== Entertainments ==
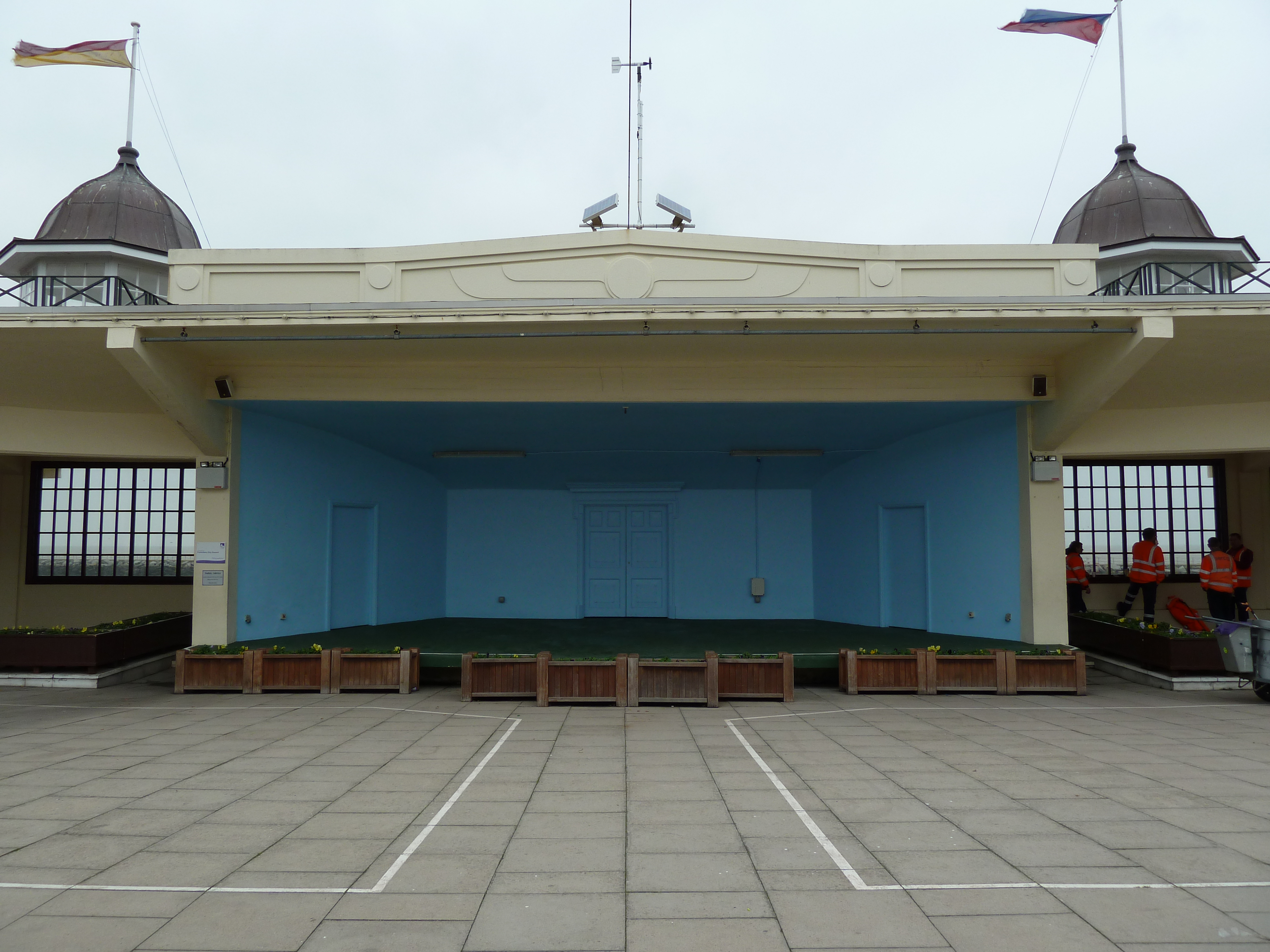
Stage in 2013

The structure was intended for military brass band concerts. These were very popular from 1924 to the end of World War II, but were then discontinued, being by that time too expensive. in the 1920s and 1930s during good weather there were two daily band performances to full house. Tea dances, originally to the music of Wylie Price and his orchestra, were popular until the 1950s, although a tea dance celebrated the 1999 reopening, and a charity tea dance to the music of Colin Jay took place in September 2000 in aid of Shopmobility. The traditional position for the Punch and Judy entertainment in summer has always been on the beach at the west side of the Pier, but since the cessation of military band concerts the Bandstand has provided a venue for Colin Bennett's puppets on rainy days. By the 1960s, general audiences for musicians and entertainers were being lured away by cheap continental holidays, and by 1974 the building was being used for children's and seniors' entertainment, and it had a children's roller skating area.

On 3 July 1999 the building was in use again for entertainment after restoration. There were concerts and fairs in celebration, including performances by organist Richard Bosworth. In July, as part of Herne Bay Festival, the Kohima Band of the Princess of Wales's Royal Regiment gave the first brass band performance in the building for 20 years, followed by a set performed by Herne Bay Sea Cadets. At the same time the information centre provided a display showing the history of Herne Bay and its bandstand. In August 1999 Whitstable Brass gave a concert at the opening of Thorley Taverns cafe-bar. Concerts were free and given in aid of charity at that time.

During May Day bank holiday, 2006, the Snowdown Colliery Welfare Band gave a free concert at the Bandstand. However, only half of the building had been freshly painted by the council, which was responsible for decorating the east side. This caused embarrassment to the director of the Bandstand cafe bar, who had not been informed of the repainting plans or the concert. East London Brass gave a concert on 5 July 2009. Arcelia performed in the Bandstand for the 2012 Herne Bay Festival. Punch and Judy provided entertainment in the Bandstand as part of Herne Bay Festival 2013. As of 2013, the building is a centre for local cafe culture and summer concerts.

== Other uses of the bandstand ==
For a long time there was a storm warning cone on top of the bandstand: an upward-pointing cone indicated a northerly gale; a downward-pointing cone meant a southerly gale was coming in. In June and July 2010, the Beltinge Art Group and the Herne Bay Art Group exhibited watercolours, acrylics and pastels in the building. In 2013 the Bandstand hosted events associated with the centenary of the visit of Marcel Duchamp to Herne Bay in 1913.

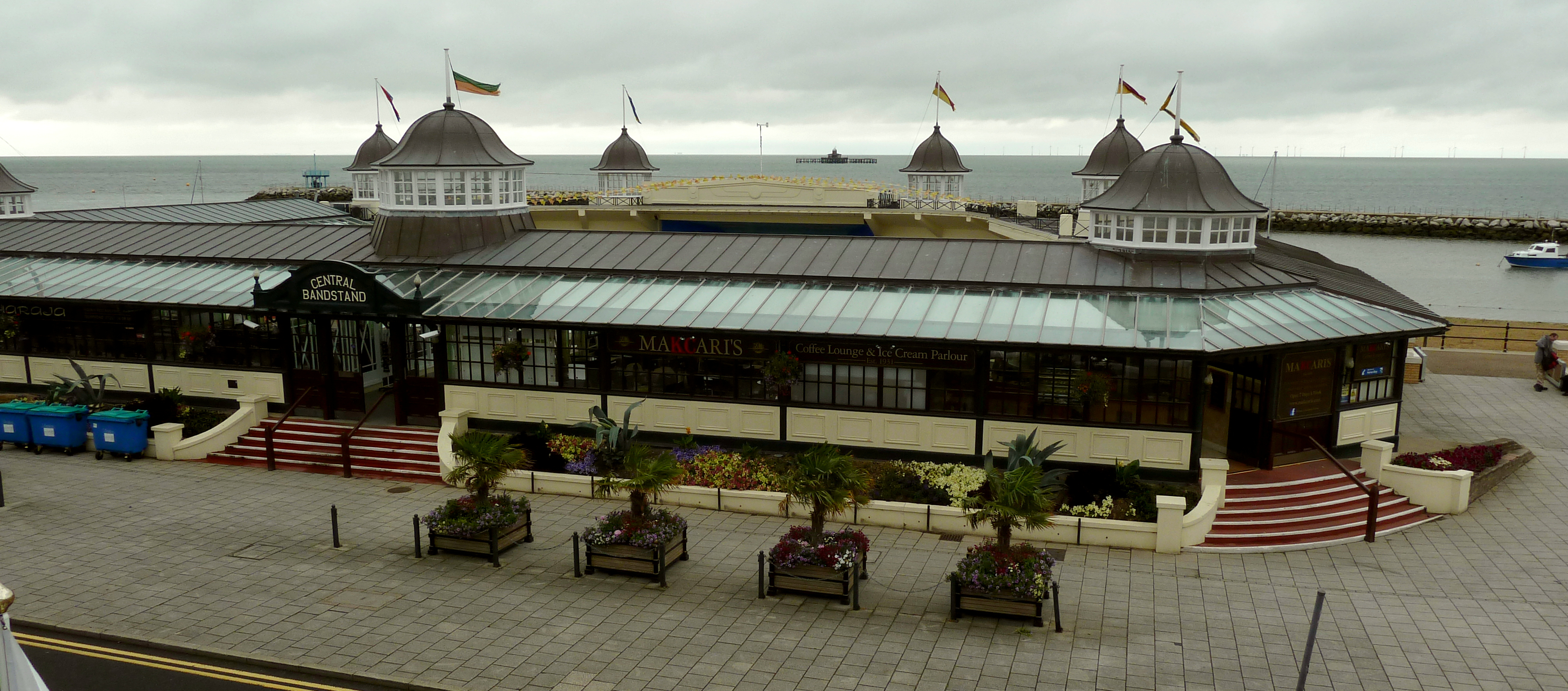
Central Bandstand in 2013
