= De Vere Gardens =

Street in Kensington, London

Coordinates: 51.5008°N 0.1849°W

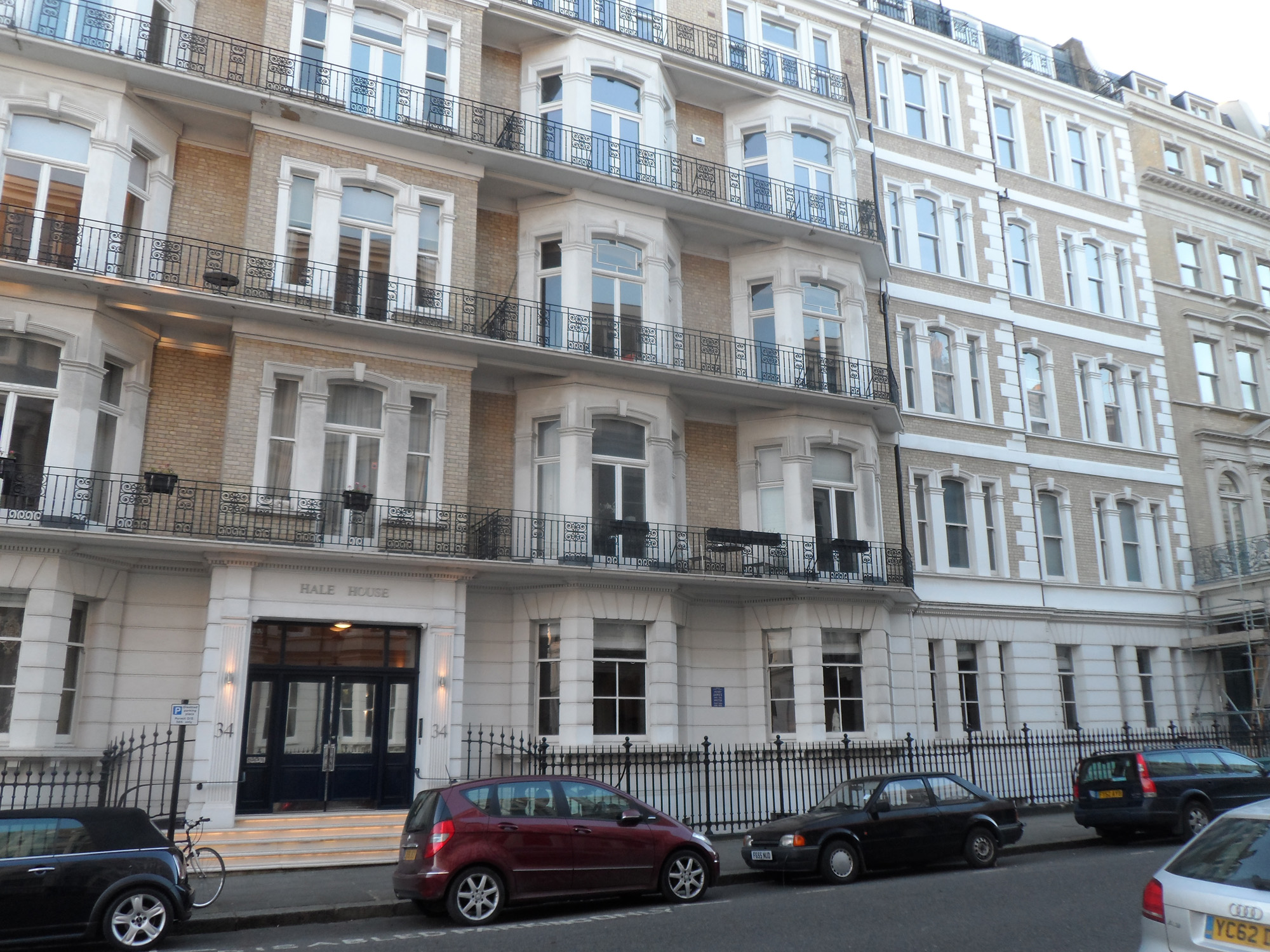
De Vere Gardens

De Vere Gardens is a street in Kensington, London, that in 2015 was considered the fifth most expensive street in England.

== Location ==
The street runs roughly north to south, from Kensington Road to Canning Place, and parallel to Victoria Road, Kensington, which is the most expensive street in England. De Vere Mews lies to the rear of the southern end of the east side of the street and is entered via Canning Place.

== History ==
Batty's Hippodrome was quickly built in 1851 to coincide with the Great Exhibition just to the east, and occupied most of the land between Victoria Road to the west and Palace Gate to the east, bounded by Kensington Road to the north and Canning Place to the south, apart from a row of houses in Craven Place on Kensington Road, and Canning Cottage, Melville Cottage and Canning Place Mews on Canning Place. After a second season in 1852, the area was largely disused except for a riding school and "hunting ground" run by W. H. Blackman from 1853 to 1874, using Batty's former stables.

The freeholder, J. D. Grimwood's had emigrated to Chile, and died in Valparaiso in 1843, and the land passed to his Chilean sons-in-law in trust equally for his seven children. From 1870 the Grimwood children sought to sell the land, but it eventually took an Order of Court to sell the five acres in 1875.

The supervising architect was George Barlow Hart, and the main builder was Charles Adams Daw, with other builders, A. F. Taylor and S. A. Cumming. The origin of the name is from the De Vere family, the Earls of Oxford, who owned a substantial part of the ancient manor of Kensington.

In December 2015, it was considered to be the fifth most expensive street in England, with an average property price of £7,359,000, according to research from Lloyds Bank, based on Land Registry data.

== Notable people ==
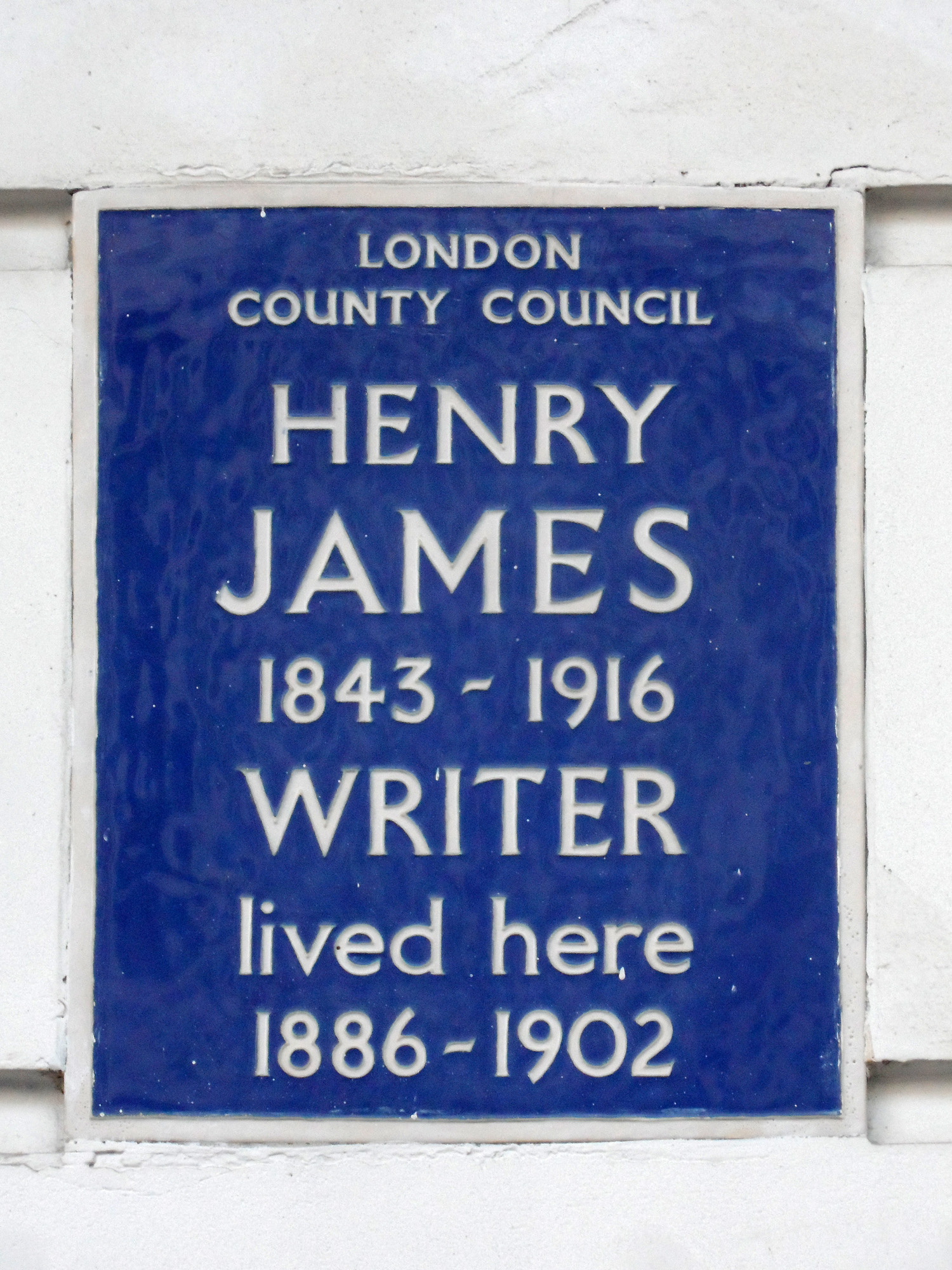
Henry James blue plaque at no 34

- Robert Browning, poet, lived there, at least in 1887-89
- H. Kempton Dyson (1880–1944), English structural engineer, civil engineer, architect, editor and author, lived and died at no 3.
- Henry James, novelist (1843-1916), lived at no 34, from 1886 to 1902
