= Callender's Cableworks Band =

English brass band

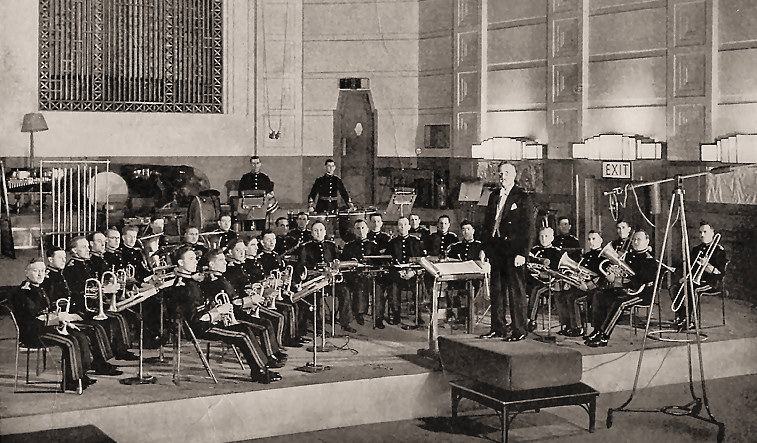
Callender's Cableworks Band performing for BBC Radio, December 1930

Callender's Cableworks Band (active 1898–1961) was an amateur brass band made up of members employed by and under the patronage of Erith Works at the Callender Cable & Construction Co. Ltd, later British Insulated Callender's Cables, in Belvedere, Kent, and performing in London and south-east England. They were prolific broadcasters in the early years of BBC Radio, and won 25 brass band competitions.

== Description ==
=== Name and location ===
Its members were employed in the Erith Works of the Callender Cable & Construction Co. Ltd, later British Insulated Callender's Cables (1945–1975). This was situated in Belvedere, now part of London but previously in Kent. Between 1898 and 1961 when they were active, they played under various names and versions of those names: Belvedere Baptist Temperance; Belvedere Excelsior; BICC; British Insulated Callender's Cables; Callender's Cables A; Callender's Cables 'A'; Callenders' Cable Works; Callender's Cable Works A; Callender's Cable Works 'A'; and Callenders Cable Works A. Callender's employees included at least a hundred instrumentalists who spent their leisure time in four band groups. In 1932 the Senior Band consisted of 31 picked men: this was the band which broadcast on BBC Radio. There was also the A-band, the B-band and a learner's class of beginners from school age onwards; the A- and B-band members and the learners could all be promoted upwards as their skills developed and vacancies occurred.

=== History ===
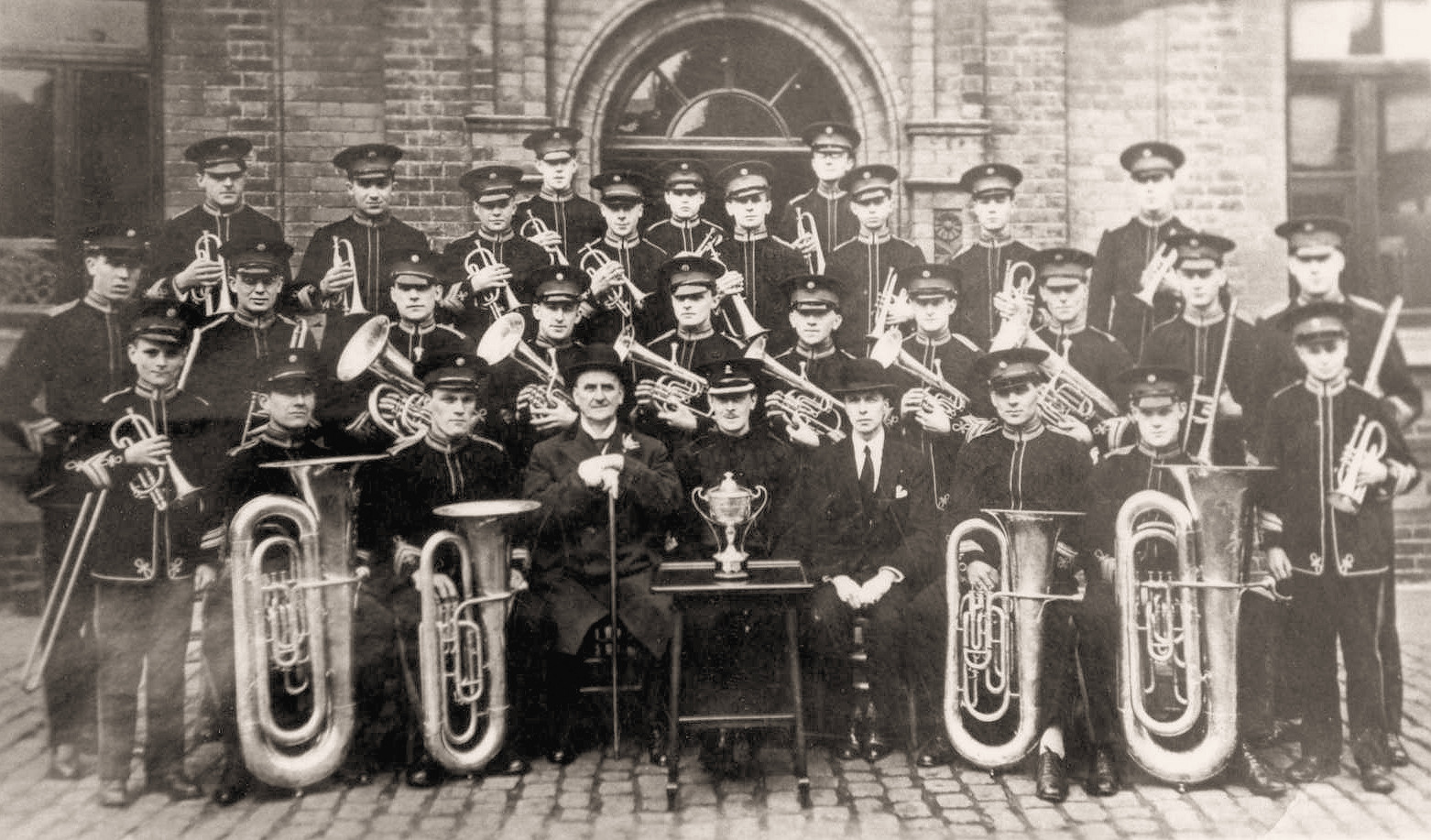
Newly formed A-Band, 1926, conductor Charles Waters centre front

The Band was started in the 1890s as a Salvation Army brass band, but because they felt limited as to the types of music which they were permitted to play, they formed their own temperance band. However this caused difficulties in purchasing their own uniforms and instruments, so their employer, Callender's, stepped in as patron. From then on they were Callender's Cableworks Band under various forms of that name. They were always an amateur band, rehearsing and performing in their leisure time.

The Senior Band had a high reputation, and in 1932 were described as the finest in the south of England. In 1929 Jim Thompson joined the band; later in 1939 he was to found the Belvedere Male Voice Choir. In 1932 the band consisted of all brass instruments, plus four saxophones. At the time they were the only brass band with saxophones. The five soloists in that year were E. Farrington and R.W. Hardy on cornet, W. Sloane on euphonium, Harold Laycock on trombone and Pat Greener on xylophone. Laycock was later principal trombone, and only ever recorded six solos. Some bandmasters such as the ex-military Tom Morgan in the 1920s could be terrifying during rehearsals, making them sweat with fear.

The "A" Band was formed in 1926. The conductor seated centre front in the image (right) is Charles Waters (d.1968). Mr Waters was Bandmaster of the Senior Band from 1924. He conducted that band at many "run of the mill" concerts, and usually played 2nd or 3rd cornet when Tom Morgan, the musical director, conducted the band. Waters was the resident conductor of the "A" Band. After Tom Morgan retired, Mr Waters became the conductor of Callender's until its demise in 1961.

== Performances and broadcasts ==
The Band's first broadcast was from 2LO on 27 February 1925. By 1932 the Band had twice toured all stations of BBC Radio, and they were to broadcast there twice again in April of that year, by which time they had broadcast 72 times on radio. By 16 December of that year, they had broadcast 80 times. They aspired to performing music which was "out of the rut of marches, operatic selections and other pierhead pieces."

They performed on 5 March 1932 at the Queen's Hall, London. On the afternoon and evening of Sunday 20 March of the same year, they performed at the opening of the new art deco frontage of the Central Bandstand, Herne Bay, Kent. On 18 December 1932 they took part in a special BBC Radio programme in which most of the music had been composed especially for them.

=== Competition results ===
In competitions over the years they had 25 wins, 11 second places and 3 third places.

For some years they took part in the Elthorne Band Contest which started in 1919 at Elthorne Park. The competition had four sections with many entries, and a massed band concert. They won the competition on 20 May 1924 and 3 May 1925, and again on 7 June 1930.

== Recordings ==
Under the name of Callenders Senior Band they recorded Colonel Bogey, Entry of the Gladiators, Le Grenadier, Les Huguenots (parts 1 and 2), Three Dale Dances and Triana on 78 rpm disks. In the late 1920s they recorded A Sailor's Life (Descriptive Fantasia), parts 1 and 2, conducted by Tom Morgan, on two Broadcast Twelve disks.

== Bibliography ==
- "Brass Bands, Callender Cable Works", in Bygone Kent, issue 13 p. 739; issue 19 pp. 209–15.
