= Britannia Hotel =

Listed building in Manchester, England

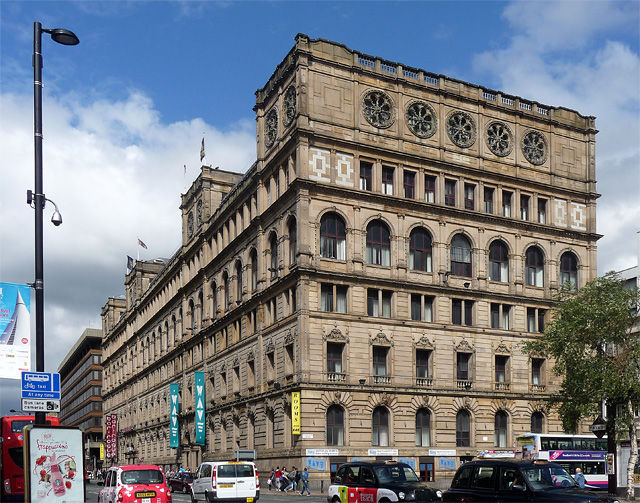
- The Britannia Hotel (formerly Watts Warehouse) in 2011

- Location within Greater Manchester
- Former names: Watts Warehouse

General information
- Architectural style: Eclectic palazzo
- Location: Portland Street, Manchester, England
- Coordinates: 53.4789°N 2.2375°W
- Construction started: 1851
- Completed: 1856
- Cost: £100,000
- Client: S. & J. Watts
- Owner: Britannia Hotels

Design and construction
- Architects: Travis and Mangnall
- Designations

Listed Building – Grade II*
- Official name: Britannia Hotel
- Designated: 25 February 1952
- Reference no.: 1246952

Website
- Official website

The Britannia Hotel (formerly Watts Warehouse) is a Grade II* listed Victorian building on Portland Street in Manchester, England. Completed in 1856 as a textile warehouse for the wholesale drapery firm S. & J. Watts, it was then the largest single‑occupancy warehouse in the city. The building is noted for its eclectic palazzo‑style architecture and its First World War memorial by Charles Sargeant Jagger. After falling out of use in the later 20th century, it was converted into a hotel, opening in 1982 as part of the Britannia Hotels chain.

== History ==
=== The Watts family ===
The textile firm S. & J. Watts Limited was founded by James Watts, a Mancunian industrialist and entrepreneur, whose textile business had started in a small weaver's cottage in Didsbury. His success as a cotton trader was part of the commercial boom of the 19th century that gave Manchester the name "Cottonopolis", when the city was a global centre for the cotton trade.

Watts became an important figure among British industrialists, socialising with politicians and churchmen at his home, Abney Hall, in Cheadle. Prince Albert chose to stay with him when he visited Manchester to open the Art Treasures Exhibition in 1857. Watts' descendants include British businessman James Watts, Conservative party politician James Watts and air commandant Dame Felicity Peake. The Watts family is also distantly related to the family of novelist Agatha Christie.

=== Construction ===
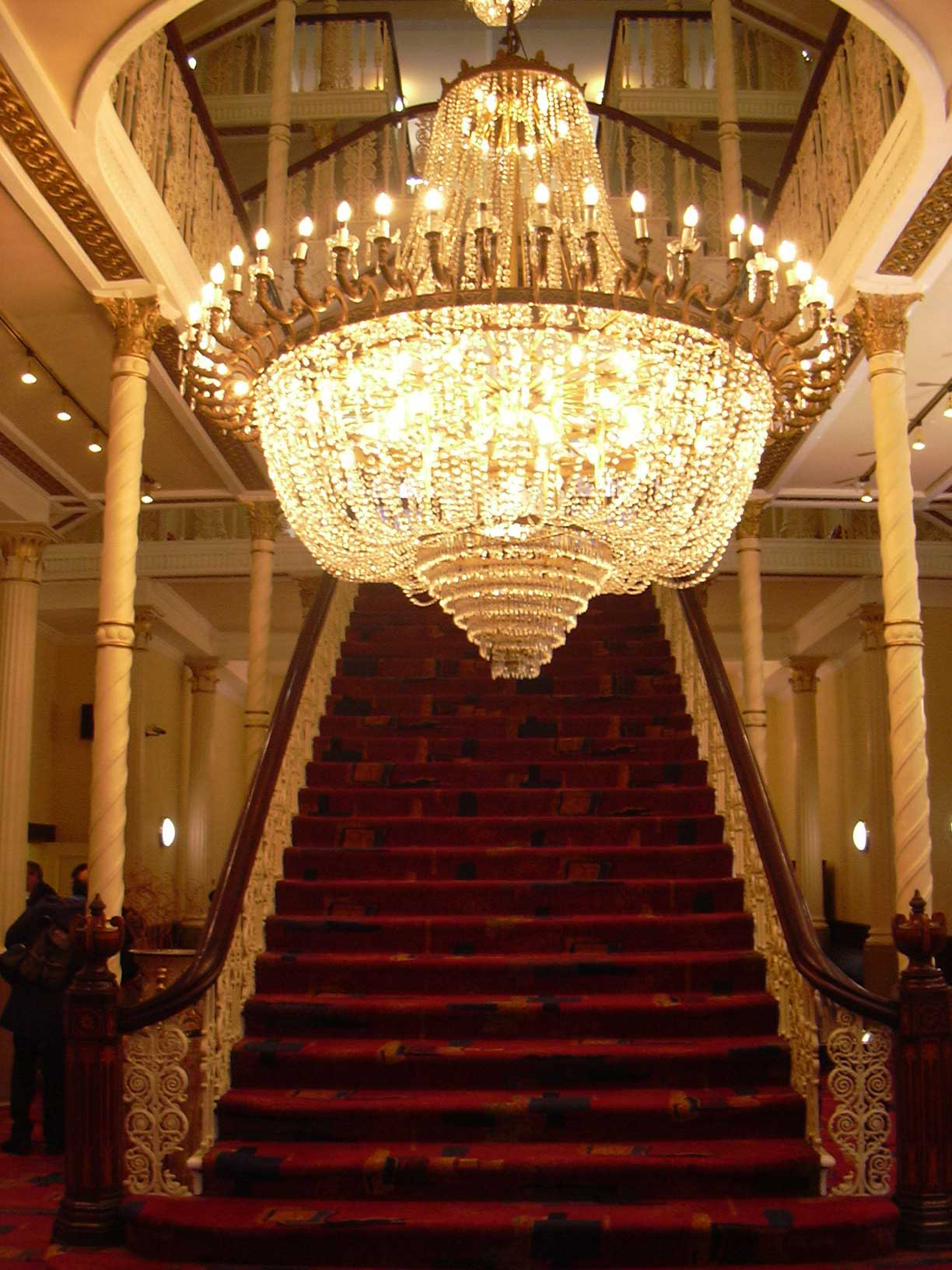
The stairwell

The sandstone-ashlar warehouse was built by the local architects Travis and Mangnall between 1851 and 1856 at a cost of £100,000. (Note: Another source gives a construction date of 1854–1858.) The elaborate design reflects the confident architectural character of many Manchester warehouses of the period, and the Watts Warehouse is distinguished by its unusually eclectic composition. Modelled on a Venetian palazzo, it has five storeys, each treated in a different style – Italian Renaissance, Elizabethan, French Renaissance and Flemish – with roof pavilions containing large Gothic wheel windows.

The interior was similarly elaborate, featuring an iron cantilever staircase, a balconied stairwell, and mahogany counters for displaying merchandise.

=== War memorial ===
The Sentry war memorial by C. S. Jagger

During the First World War, many employees of S. & J. Watts lost their lives in service between 1914 and 1918. In 1922 the company commemorated them by installing a memorial in the main entrance on Portland Street. A bronze sculpture, The Sentry, stands in an arched niche on the right, with a marble plaque honouring the dead on the opposite side. The statue depicts a sentry wearing a Tommy helmet, First World War battle dress and a cape, standing on guard with his rifle and fixed bayonet. It was commissioned from the British sculptor Charles Sargeant Jagger, who also designed the Royal Artillery Memorial at Hyde Park Corner in London. A statuette version of the figure is displayed in the study at Eltham Palace, where it was kept by Stephen Courtauld, who, like Jagger, served in the Artists' Rifles during the war.

To the enduring memory of those members of the staff of S & J Watts & Co. who laid down their lives for their King and country in the cause of truth, justice and freedom during the Great War. Their name liveth for evermore.

— Memorial inscription, Watts Warehouse, Portland Street entrance

The war memorial appears on the Imperial War Museum's register.

=== Manchester Blitz ===
During the Second World War, the Watts Warehouse was hit by Luftwaffe bombs, but it was saved from destruction when the fire was smothered by textiles.

=== Conversion to a hotel ===
The textile industries that had sustained Manchester eventually declined and, like many industrial buildings in Northern England, Watts Warehouse fell out of use and remained derelict for many years. On 25 February 1952, Watts Warehouse was designated a Grade II* listed building. and was threatened with demolition in 1972 but was ultimately retained. During the 1980s it was converted for new use, with many original interior features preserved. In May 1982, the Britannia Hotel opened as part of the Britannia Hotels chain, initially with 25 rooms and a nightclub, later expanding to 363 bedrooms.

== Architecture ==
The building is constructed of sandstone ashlar and has a large rectangular footprint running parallel to the street. It is designed in an eclectic palazzo style and rises five storeys above a basement, with roof pavilions. The front elevation is symmetrical and divided into 23 bays. It has a granite base, a broad chamfered plinth, and strong horizontal detailing on the lower floors. The upper storeys have fluted corner features and projecting cornices, and four large rectangular pavilions are set at each end and on either side of a central seven‑bay section.

Each floor has its own treatment of the window openings, all of which are recessed. The ground floor has round‑headed windows with prominent stonework, except for paired doorways in two positions, which have arched entrances on coupled columns and internal steps. The first floor has square windows with balustrades and decorative surrounds. The second floor has square openings framed by small column screens. The third floor has taller round‑headed windows with marked imposts and keystones. The fourth floor has windows set within continuous colonnades of short square columns.

The pavilions have panelled vertical features, cornices, parapets and two large Gothic wheel windows. The side elevations repeat the main design, with seven bays, matching pavilions containing wheel windows in five bays, decorative strapwork in the outer bays, and parapets with balustrades.

=== Interior ===
Inside the left‑hand entrance is a small porch that contains a First World War memorial dating from around 1920, made up of a bronze figure group and an inscribed panel. Beyond this, the entrance hall is dominated by an open cast‑iron staircase. Its flights rise at the sides on each level, creating a series of bridges that recall the shape of the Rialto crossing.

== See also ==
- Grade II* listed buildings in Greater Manchester
- Listed buildings in Manchester-M1
