= Paula Vennells =

British businesswoman and priest (born 1959)

The Reverend Paula Vennells
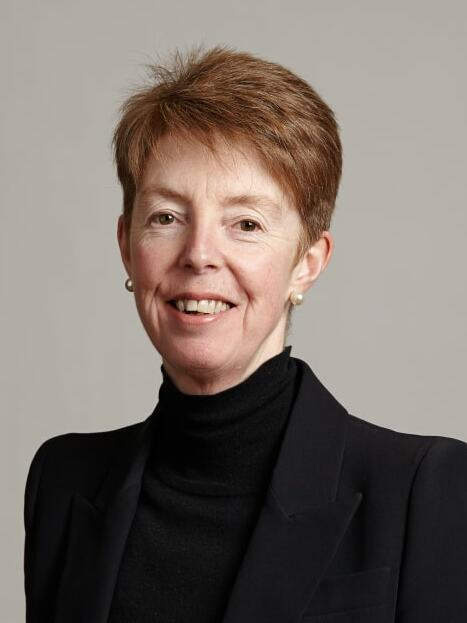
- Vennells in 2016
- Born: Paula Anne Vennells; 21 February 1959 (age 67); Denton, Lancashire, England
- Education: Manchester High School for Girls
- Alma mater: University of Bradford (BA)
- Occupations: Businessperson; Anglican priest
- Known for: Post Office scandal
- Spouse: John Wilson (m. 1994)
- Children: 2

Paula Anne Vennells (born 21 February 1959) is a British former businesswoman who was the chief executive officer (CEO) of Post Office Limited from 2012 to 2019. She is also an ordained Anglican priest who ceased her clerical duties in 2021.

Vennells was the CEO of Post Office Limited during the latter part of the British Post Office scandal, in which more than 900 subpostmasters were wrongly convicted between 1999 and 2015 of theft, false accounting or fraud, owing to apparent shortfalls at their Post Office branches that were caused by flaws in Horizon, an accounting software used by the Post Office. Many more subpostmasters paid the Post Office for alleged shortfalls or had their contracts terminated. The actions of the Post Office caused the loss of jobs, bankruptcy, family breakdown, criminal convictions, prison sentences and at least thirteen suicides. Under Vennells, the Post Office led a costly and unsuccessful attempt to defend a group action brought by subpostmasters.

In 2019 she became the chair of the Imperial College Healthcare NHS Trust, but left the role the following year. In 2021, after the convictions of 39 subpostmasters were quashed, she resigned from her non-executive directorships at the retailer Dunelm and the supermarket chain Morrisons. Vennells had been appointed Commander of the Order of the British Empire (CBE) in 2019; the honour was revoked in 2024 for "bringing the honours system into disrepute".

== Early life and education ==
Paula Anne Vennells was born on 21 February 1959, in Denton, Lancashire, where she grew up. Her father was an industrial chemist and academic, her mother a great-granddaughter of Sir James Watts of Abney Hall, mayor of Manchester in the 1850s and grandfather of Conservative party member of Parliament James Watts. Having won a funded place, she went to Manchester High School for Girls, then an all-girls direct grant grammar school in Manchester. In 1981, she gained a BA in Russian and French interpreting with Economics at the University of Bradford.

== Career ==
=== Early career ===
Vennells decided against being an interpreter and, in 1981, she became a graduate trainee accountant at Unilever. She worked at its subsidiary Van Den Bergh & Jurgens, and also began a foundation course in accountancy. She then began working in marketing, and later at another Unilever company as a junior product manager for pharmaceuticals.

She later had product manager and marketing manager roles for L'Oréal, BAA, and Hamleys. She then became marketing director for Lunn Poly, and later held similar roles for Reed International Exhibitions, Dixons Group and Sears plc. From 1998 to 2001, Vennells was marketing and e-commerce director at Argos (then owned by GUS plc). She then worked as marketing director and then group commercial director at Whitbread until 2006.

=== Post Office Limited ===
In January 2007, she joined Post Office Limited as network director, responsible for around 15,000 post offices. In late 2009, she took on the role of network and sales director, a similar role but with additional responsibilities for the national sales department. She became Chief Operating Officer on 1 April 2010 and managing director on 18 October 2010.

On 1 April 2012, she became the company's chief executive officer (CEO), at the same time as it was split from Royal Mail Group to become a separate government-owned company. In 2017, her title became Group CEO, as Post Office Limited expanded.

During her time as CEO, the Post Office went from losing £120 million in 2012/13 to reporting a profit of £35 million in 2017/18. The liabilities now known to have accrued over that period due to the Horizon scandal, however, were estimated in early 2024 to be £160 million in compensation, £298 million in ongoing legal fees already paid, and £1 billion of taxpayers’ money set aside for future compensation.

In her role leading the Post Office, Vennells earned a total of £5.1 million, peaking in 2018 when she received £718,300 in salary, bonuses, pensions and other benefits. In 2016, she was appointed as a non-executive director of supermarket chain Morrisons, in addition to her position at the Post Office.

In February 2019, it was announced that she would step down from her Post Office role, and that month she was appointed as a non-executive board member at the Cabinet Office.

=== Later career ===
In April 2019, she took over as the chair of Imperial College Healthcare NHS Trust; she resigned from this role in 2021.

=== Church of England ===
From 2002 to 2005, Vennells trained for holy orders on the St Albans and Oxford Ministry Course. She was ordained in the Church of England as a deacon in 2005 and as a priest in 2006. She has served as a non-stipendiary minister at the Church of St Owen, Bromham in the Diocese of St Albans. In January 2024, BBC News reported that sources had told them that, around 2017, when Richard Chartres's tenure as Bishop of London was drawing to a close, Vennells had been interviewed for the post — the third most senior role in the Church of England; she received support from the Archbishop of Canterbury, and reached the final shortlist of three. She relinquished her clerical duties in 2021, but remained an ordained priest as of January 2024.

In April 2021, following the Post Office scandal, Vennells agreed to step back from her duties as an associate minister. Alan Smith, bishop of St Albans and himself the son of a subpostmaster, said that it was "right" that Vennells did so. She stepped down from her membership of the Church of England's Ethical Investment Advisory Group in May 2021.

=== Post Office scandal ===
Vennells was the CEO of Post Office Ltd during the latter part of the Post Office scandal, which involved more than 900 subpostmasters being wrongly convicted of theft, false accounting and fraud between 1999 and 2015 because of shortfalls at their branches that were in fact errors of the Horizon accounting software used by the Post Office. Thousands of subpostmasters paid for shortfalls caused by Horizon and/or had their contracts terminated. The actions of the Post Office caused the loss of jobs, bankruptcy, family breakdown, criminal convictions, prison sentences and at least thirteen suicides. In total, over 4,000 subpostmasters would eventually become eligible for compensation.

In 2013, Post Office Limited hired forensic accounting firm Second Sight, headed by Ron Warmington, to investigate the Horizon software losses. Warmington discovered the system was flawed and faulty, but Vennells was unhappy with Warmington's report and terminated their contract. Prior to her role as CEO, Vennells was the Chief Operating Officer of Post Office Ltd, a position in which—according to the evidence of the then CEO, David Smith—she had responsibility for management of the "operational use" of the Horizon software.

Acting as a private prosecutor, the Post Office repeatedly failed to make full disclosure of known Horizon problems either to defendants or to the courts in hundreds of cases. According to the Criminal Cases Review Commission, the nondisclosure is "the most widespread miscarriage of justice the CCRC has ever seen and represents the biggest single series of wrongful convictions in British legal history".

In Bates & Others v Post Office Ltd, a group action brought by 555 subpostmasters against the Post Office, the presiding judge, Mr Justice Fraser described the Post Office's approach to the case as "institutional obstinacy". Vennells subsequently issued a statement, saying: "It was and remains a source of great regret to me that these colleagues and their families were affected over so many years. I am truly sorry we were unable to find both a solution and a resolution outside of litigation and for the distress this caused." The Post Office spent £100 million of public money in unsuccessfully defending the case. Following the conclusion of the case Vennells's tenure as CEO was criticised in Parliament. The Conservative peer Lord Arbuthnot of Edrom said that "The hallmark of Paula Vennells' time as CEO was that she was willing to accept appalling advice from people in her management and legal teams. The consequences of this were far-reaching for the Post Office and devastating for the subpostmasters", and he described the behaviour of the Post Office under her leadership as "both cruel and incompetent".

In March 2020, Vennells resigned her position as a non-executive board member at the Cabinet Office. The Care Quality Commission (CQC) discussed concerns about Vennells's continuing role in the NHS on 8 July 2020. On 3 December 2020, it was announced that Vennells would step down as chair of the Imperial College Healthcare NHS Trust, a position for which she was paid £50,000 a year, in April 2021, for personal reasons.

In a BBC Panorama programme screened on 8 June 2020, reporter Nick Wallis is seen phoning Vennells, who terminates the call rather than answer his questions. Wallis says "this is one of the biggest frustrations of covering this story ... the consistent refusal of the chief executive and the people at the top to answer serious questions about what has been happening".

In June 2020, the Criminal Cases Review Commission sent 47 cases, in which subpostmasters had been prosecuted, to the Court of Appeal, as potential miscarriages of justice. During the case, the Post Office's conduct under Vennells's leadership was described as an instance of "appalling and shameful behaviour". In April 2021, 39 former postmasters had their convictions quashed, and another 22 cases were still being investigated by the Criminal Cases Review Commission. She apologised, saying "I am truly sorry for the suffering caused to the 39 subpostmasters as a result of their convictions which were overturned last week".

On the same day, she resigned her non-executive directorships at UK supermarket chain Morrisons and furnishings group Dunelm. She also resigned as a governor of Bedford School, a position she had held since 2014.

Vennells was portrayed by Lia Williams in a four-part television drama series, Mr Bates vs The Post Office, broadcast on ITV in January 2024 and released in its entirety on ITVX.

=== Horizon IT inquiry ===
Over three days in May 2024, Vennells gave sometimes tearful evidence to the statutory public inquiry into the Horizon scandal, chaired by Wyn Williams. On the first two days she was questioned by counsel to the inquiry, Jason Beer KC. On the third day it was the turn of counsel for the core participants, including the subpostmaster victims, to question Vennells. Vennells had submitted two witness statements totalling over 798 pages to the inquiry, which she denied was a "craven, self-serving account", as suggested by one of the counsel representing victims.

Much of the evidence heard during the three days related to the extent that Vennells had known of flaws in the Horizon IT system and the unsafe nature of prosecutions of subpostmasters. The inquiry was shown a recent exchange of texts between Vennells and Moya Greene, former CEO of Royal Mail, in which Greene said "I think you knew… How could you not have known?" Asked the same question by Beer, Vennells said "This is a situation that is so complex, it is a question I have asked myself as well."

During her testimony, Vennells consistently stated she was unaware of the facts or, when confronted with documents that showed she had been made aware of them, said she had not understood them. She said she had given MPs incorrect information in 2012 when she told them there had been no unsuccessful Horizon prosecutions. She said that the Post Office had known but she personally had not known. She said she had been "too trusting" and accused five key executives (IT executives Mike Young and Lesley Sewell, and legal general counsels Susan Crichton, Chris Aujard and Jane MacLeod) of having withheld information from her.

In a later session, the inquiry saw an internal paper drawn up in February 2014 by a committee within the Department for Business and the Shareholder Executive which considered options for dismissing Vennells from her CEO role. This followed an annual review which had raised concerns about her people management skills and a lack of knowledge of the business.

=== Awards and honours ===
In the 2019 New Year Honours, Vennells was appointed Commander of the Order of the British Empire (CBE) for services to the Post Office and to charity.

In 2021, after the successful appeals by subpostmasters prosecuted and convicted in the Post Office scandal, the Communication Workers Union called for Vennells to be stripped of her CBE. In the same year, an online petition was created on the website 38 Degrees requesting that the Honours Forfeiture Committee revoke Vennells's CBE; in January 2024, following the broadcast of Mr Bates vs The Post Office, it attracted significant attention and by 9 January had received 1.2 million signatures.

On 8 January 2024, Prime Minister Rishi Sunak's spokesman said he would "strongly support" the Honours Forfeiture Committee if it decided to look at revoking Vennells's CBE appointment. On 9 January, Vennells stated that she would return her CBE "with immediate effect". The honour was formally revoked by King Charles III on 23 February for "bringing the honours system into disrepute".

== Personal life ==
Vennells met her husband, John Wilson, at the Bradford University dinghy club. He is a former global vice-president at the international engineering firm ABB. They married in 1994, have two sons, and live at Box End, near Bedford, in a Grade II listed property.

Business positions
Preceded by David Smith as Managing Director	Chief Executive Officer of Post Office Limited; 2011–2019	Succeeded by Nick Read
Preceded by Sir Richard Sykes	Chair of Imperial College Healthcare NHS Trust; 2019–2021	Succeeded by Matthew Swindells
