= Sharston Hall =

Former English manor house

Coordinates: 53.3929°N 2.2518°W

Sharston Hall was a manor house built in Sharston, an area of Wythenshawe, Manchester, England, in 1701. A three-storey building with Victorian additions, it was purchased by Thomas Worthington, an early umbrella tycoon, and occupied by the Worthington family until 1856, when the last male heir died. The hall was occupied by the Henriques family in the 1920s, but following their death in a motor accident in 1932 the house was converted into flats. (Note: David Q. Henriques was a Manchester stockbroker and magistrate. He apparently lost control of the car he was driving in Hazel Grove and was involved in a head-on collision with a tram travelling in the opposite direction. Both Henriques and his wife died on their way to Stockport Infirmary.) Manchester Corporation purchased the hall in 1926. During the Second World War it was leased by the local watch committee for use by the police, civil defence and fire services.

From 1941 until 1957 Sharston Hall's coach house served as Wythenshawe's fire station. In 1948 the Sharston Community Association, founded that same year, was allocated part of the hall for use as a community centre. Two years later the association took over the entire house, expanding in 1957 to also occupy the coach house then recently vacated by the fire service.

By the late 1960s the hall was in a poor state of repair and was boarded up. Sharston Hall was demolished in 1986, replaced by offices in a sympathetic 18th-century style – or what Pevsner's architectural guide calls a parody of it – and houses.
