= Listed buildings in Herne and Broomfield =

Historic structures in Kent, England

Herne and Broomfield is a village and civil parish in the City of Canterbury district of Kent, England. It contains 42 listed buildings that are recorded in the National Heritage List for England. Of these two are grade I and 40 are grade II.

This list is based on the information retrieved online from Historic England.

== Key ==
Grade	Criteria
I	Buildings that are of exceptional interest
II*	Particularly important buildings of more than special interest
II	Buildings that are of special interest

== Listing ==
Name	Grade	Location	Type	Completed (Note: The date given is the date used by Historic England as significant for the initial building or that of an important part in the structure's description.)	Date designated	Grid ref. (Note: The grid reference is based on the British national grid reference system, sometimes known as OSGB36, used by the Ordnance Survey.) Geo-coordinates	Notes	Entry number (Note: The "List Entry Number" is a unique number assigned to each listed building and scheduled monument by Historic England.)	Image	Wikidata
Rose Cottage	II	Bogshole Lane			9 August 1989	TR1975267037; 51°21′36″N 1°09′18″E		1084958	Upload Photo	Q26370017
Barn to South of Hawe Manor	II	Broomfield Road, Herne Bay, CT6 7AZ			14 May 1976	TR1902566115; 51°21′07″N 1°08′39″E		1084997	Upload Photo	Q26370232
Hawe Manor	II	Broomfield Road, Herne Bay, CT6 7AZ			29 September 1951	TR1897966155; 51°21′08″N 1°08′36″E		1336832	Upload Photo	Q26621298
Downtops'l	II	Bullockstone Road, Herne Bay			14 May 1976	TR1696765902; 51°21′03″N 1°06′52″E		1084998	Upload Photo	Q26370237
Herne Grove Farmhouse	II	Bullockstone Road, Herne Common			29 September 1951	TR1718065020; 51°20′34″N 1°07′01″E		1336833	Upload Photo	Q26621299
Busheyfield Farmhouse	II	41, Busheyfields Road, Herne Bay			14 May 1976	TR1784064845; 51°20′27″N 1°07′35″E		1084999	Upload Photo	Q26370244
Thatched Cottage	II	Canterbury Road, Herne Common			14 May 1976	TR1755865133; 51°20′37″N 1°07′21″E		1336835	Upload Photo	Q26621301
Walnut Tree Cottage	II	Canterbury Road, Herne Common			14 May 1976	TR1742065013; 51°20′33″N 1°07′13″E		1320386	Upload Photo	Q26606388
Broomfield House	II	Ford Road, Broomfield			14 May 1976	TR1995966648; 51°21′23″N 1°09′28″E		1115144	Upload Photo	Q26408892
Goldfinch Farmhouse	II	Ford Road, Broomfield			29 September 1951	TR1999666579; 51°21′20″N 1°09′30″E		1336837	Upload Photo	Q26621303
Smugglers Cottages	II	1-4, Herne Street, Herne			29 September 1951	TR1826565910; 51°21′01″N 1°07′59″E		1085012	Upload Photo	Q26370317
Hill Cottages the Risings	II	4, Herne Street, Herne			14 May 1976	TR1831565863; 51°21′00″N 1°08′01″E		1085013	Upload Photo	Q26370324
Chapel Cottage	II	Herne Street, Herne			11 November 1975	TR1835965848; 51°20′59″N 1°08′04″E		1085015	Upload Photo	Q26370335
Chestnut Cottage Globe Cottage	II	Herne Street, Herne			14 May 1976	TR1829965892; 51°21′01″N 1°08′01″E		1336839	Upload Photo	Q26621305
Church View Leo Cottage	II	Herne Street, Herne			14 May 1976	TR1830865875; 51°21′00″N 1°08′01″E		1139017	Upload Photo	Q26431976
Church of St Martin	I	Herne Street, Herne	church building		29 September 1951	TR1826665852; 51°20′59″N 1°07′59″E		1084972	Church of St Martin More images	Q17529469
Colonial Cottage Sunnyside	II	Herne Street, Herne			14 May 1976	TR1829265904; 51°21′01″N 1°08′00″E		1115129	Upload Photo	Q26408878
Forge Cottage Street Cottage	II	Herne Street, Herne			14 May 1976	TR1831865833; 51°20′59″N 1°08′02″E		1139000	Upload Photo	Q26431962
Herne Post Office	II	Herne Street, Herne			14 May 1976	TR1824365920; 51°21′02″N 1°07′58″E		1336859	Upload Photo	Q26621324
Hill Cottage	II	Herne Street, Herne			14 May 1976	TR1832665846; 51°20′59″N 1°08′02″E		1329917	Upload Photo	Q26615102
Horninglow Cottage	II	Herne Street, Herne			14 May 1976	TR1832265854; 51°20′59″N 1°08′02″E		1085014	Upload Photo	Q26370328
Ivy House	II	Herne Street, Herne			29 September 1951	TR1820366005; 51°21′04″N 1°07′56″E		1336860	Upload Photo	Q26621325
Ridley Cottages	II	Herne Street, Herne			14 May 1976	TR1823065946; 51°21′02″N 1°07′57″E		1084974	Upload Photo	Q26370100
St Christophers	II	Herne Street, Herne			29 September 1951	TR1828465798; 51°20′58″N 1°08′00″E		1336858	Upload Photo	Q26621323
Stone House	II	Herne Street, Herne			14 May 1976	TR1823765933; 51°21′02″N 1°07′58″E		1084973	Upload Photo	Q26370094
Street House	II	Herne Street, Herne			14 May 1976	TR1833065834; 51°20′59″N 1°08′02″E		1336840	Upload Photo	Q26621306
Pond Cottages	II	1 and 2, Margate Road, Broomfield			14 May 1976	TR1990266732; 51°21′25″N 1°09′25″E		1084979	Upload Photo	Q26370128
Pond Cottages	II	3, 4 and 5, Margate Road, Broomfield			14 May 1976	TR1990266722; 51°21′25″N 1°09′25″E		1145842	Upload Photo	Q26438987
Ivy Cottage	II	37, Margate Road, Broomfield			14 May 1976	TR1938866916; 51°21′32″N 1°08′59″E		1145852	Upload Photo	Q26439000
Gothic House	II	40, Margate Road, Broomfield			14 May 1976	TR1938266805; 51°21′29″N 1°08′59″E		1084982	Upload Photo	Q26370146
Spicers Farmhouse	II	129, Margate Road, Broomfield			14 May 1976	TR1985666848; 51°21′29″N 1°09′23″E		1084981	Upload Photo	Q26370140
Barn to North of Parsonage Farmhouse	II	Margate Road, Broomfiled			14 May 1976	TR1998666830; 51°21′29″N 1°09′30″E		1084980	Upload Photo	Q26370133
Parsonage Farmhouse	II	Margate Road, Broomfield			14 May 1976	TR1979266883; 51°21′31″N 1°09′20″E		1318924	Upload Photo	Q26605032
The Huntsman and Horn Public House	II	Margate Road, Broomfield			14 May 1976	TR1991166776; 51°21′27″N 1°09′26″E		1336863	Upload Photo	Q26621328
86 and 88, Mill Lane	II	86 and 88, Mill Lane, Herne			14 May 1976	TR1854166478; 51°21′19″N 1°08′15″E		1145865	Upload Photo	Q26439017
Herne Windmill	I	Mill Lane, Herne	windmill		29 September 1951	TR1851066486; 51°21′19″N 1°08′13″E		1084984	Herne Windmill More images	Q5742354
Smugglers Haunt	II	1, School Lane, Herne			14 May 1976	TR1828065923; 51°21′02″N 1°08′00″E		1336866	Upload Photo	Q26621331
Myrtle Cottages	II	3 and 5, School Lane, Herne			14 May 1976	TR1829565933; 51°21′02″N 1°08′01″E		1318871	Upload Photo	Q26604985
Belsey Cottage	II	7, School Lane, Herne			14 May 1976	TR1830565942; 51°21′02″N 1°08′01″E		1084990	Upload Photo	Q26370188
9, School Lane	II	9, School Lane, Herne			14 May 1976	TR1831165946; 51°21′02″N 1°08′01″E		1145895	Upload Photo	Q26439051
13 and 15, School Lane	II	13 and 15, School Lane, Herne			3 April 1975	TR1832365962; 51°21′03″N 1°08′02″E		1084991	Upload Photo	Q26370194
21 and 23, School Lane	II	21 and 23, School Lane, Herne			14 May 1976	TR1835165973; 51°21′03″N 1°08′04″E		1336867	Upload Photo	Q26621332

== See also ==
- Grade I listed buildings in Kent
- Grade II* listed buildings in Kent

== Sources ==
- Newman, John (2013) [1969], Kent: North-East and East, The Buildings of England, New Haven and London: Yale University Press, ISBN 978-0-300-18506-5
