= Broomfield, Herne Bay =

Village in Kent, England

Coordinates: 51.358°N 1.156°E

Broomfield
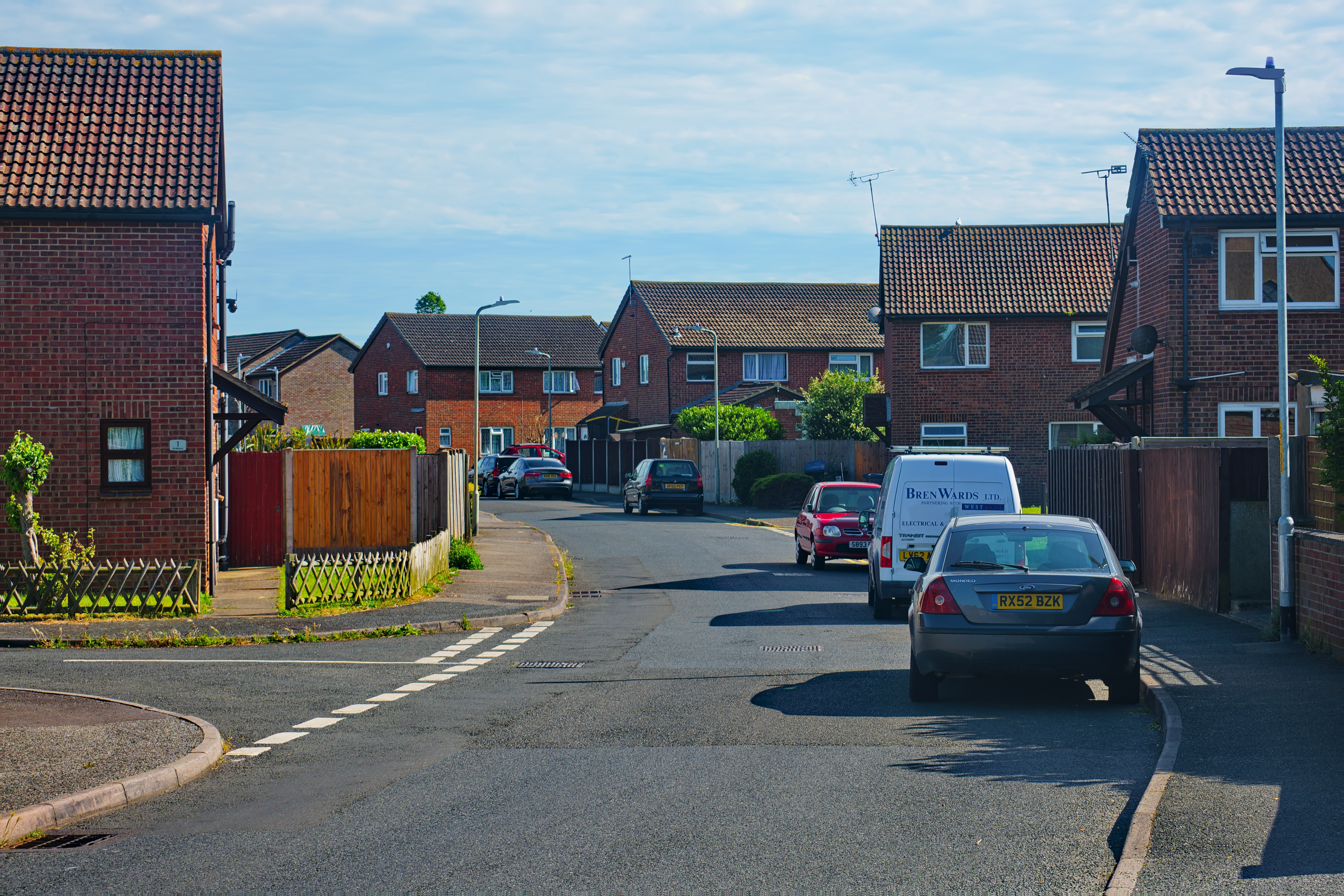

- Location within Kent
- District: City of Canterbury
- Shire county: Kent
- Region: South East
- Country: England
- Sovereign state: United Kingdom
- Post town: HERNE BAY
- Postcode district: CT6
- Dialling code: 01227
- Police: Kent
- Fire: Kent
- Ambulance: South East Coast

Broomfield is a village in Kent, England, divided by the Thanet Way from the seaside town of Herne Bay. It is part of the Herne and Broomfield civil parish, which according to the 2001 Census had a population of 7,325. At the 2011 census the population was included in the civil parish of Herne and Broomfield.

Parts of the village were once in the Strode Park Estate.

Broomfield has seen much housing development in the last two decades, particularly to the west and north of the village. Consequently, the boundary with neighbouring Herne has become blurred. Despite this, there are few shops: aside from the village's post office on Margate Road, there is a mini-supermarket, two takeaways and a hairdresser on Hawe Farm Way.

There is one pub in the village, the Huntsman & Horn. Located on Margate Road, the Huntsman & Horn overlooks Broomfield Pond. There is also one church, Broomfield United Reformed Church, located on The Meadows.

To the south of Broomfield lies East Blean Woods, while to the south-east is a world-championship standard BMX track, opened in 2007 by BBC presenter Kaddy Lee-Preston on a former landfill site.
