= James Watts (mayor) =

Sir James Watts JP (6 March 1804 – 7 April 1878) was Mayor of Manchester (1855–1857), High Sheriff of Lancashire and owner of Abney Hall. He was the owner of S & J Watts Limited, who built the Watts Warehouse on Portland Street.

Watts was born March 1804, and baptised on 15 April 1804 at St Thomas Ardwick. He started his life as a weaver in Didsbury. He became partners with his brothers Samuel and John and became an important figure among British industrialists, socialising with politicians and churchmen at his home, Abney Hall, in Cheadle. He was elected a councillor for St James's Ward, became mayor in 1855, was re-elected in 1856, and at the same time an alderman. After Prince Albert chose to stay with him when he visited Manchester to open the Art Treasures Exhibition in 1857, the queen awarded him a knighthood.

Watts married Margaret Ann Buckley. They had one son, James Watts. Watts' descendants include Conservative party politician James Watts, air commandant Dame Felicity Peake and her son, Andrew, and Paula Vennells.
