= Herne and Broomfield =

Civil parish in Kent, England

Coordinates: 51.3492°N 1.1331°E

- Location within Kent
- Population: 8,440 (2011)
- OS grid reference: TR181658
- Civil parish: Herne and Broomfield
- District: City of Canterbury
- Shire county: Kent
- Region: South East
- Country: England
- Sovereign state: United Kingdom
- Post town: CANTERBURY
- Postcode district: CT6
- Dialling code: 01227
- Police: Kent
- Fire: Kent
- Ambulance: South East Coast
- UK Parliament: Herne Bay and Sandwich

Herne and Broomfield is a civil parish and electoral ward within the City of Canterbury. The parish is situated to the north of Canterbury in Kent. The seaside town of Herne Bay is the other side of the A299 road, Thanet Way that marks the northern boundary of the parish. Greenhill, part of Herne Bay, lies to the west, the parishes of Hoath and Chislet are to the east and Sturry parish is to the South.

The village of Herne and the now merged hamlet of Broomfield have both expanded greatly over recent years and between them have a population of over 8,000 people.

The original Micropub, The Butchers Arms, opened in Herne in 2005.

== History ==
The Parish Council was created in May 1996 following a successful campaign by local residents (having previously been part of the unparished area which was formerly Herne Bay Urban District). It is the second newest (since Hersden Parish Council was created in 2019) and largest of twenty-six parishes in the City of Canterbury.

== See also ==
- Listed buildings in Herne and Broomfield
