= Manchester One =

High-rise building in Manchester, England

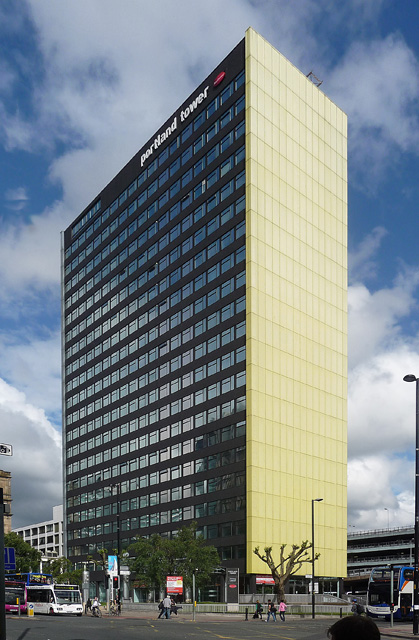
- Former names: Portland Tower; St. Andrew's House

General information
- Type: Office
- Location: 53 Portland Street, Manchester, England
- Coordinates: 53.4781°N 2.238191°W
- Completed: 1962

Height
- Roof: 77 m (250 ft)

Technical details
- Floor count: 21
- Floor area: 9,500 m^{2} (102,000 sq ft)

Design and construction
- Architect: Leach Rhodes Walker

Manchester One, formerly known as Portland Tower and previously St. Andrew's House, is a high-rise building in Manchester, England, owned by Bruntwood and let out as office space. The tower is located at 53 Portland Street from which it was named. The tower was one of the first high-rise buildings built in the 1960s in the United Kingdom, at 77 m (250 ft) tall.

In 2002, the west side of the tower was painted bright yellow and boasted the logo for the 2002 Commonwealth Games. It was one of Manchester's tallest buildings when completed, and has since been renovated as part of Manchester city centre's regeneration.

== Name ==
The tower was built as St. Andrew's House and was renamed Portland Tower in the 1990s. Bruntwood subsequently renamed the building "Manchester One" in November 2012.

== Occupiers ==
Occupiers of Manchester One include:

- Consulate General of the Republic of Poland in Manchester
- Cundall
- Gaydio, Manchester's LGBT radio station
- ibrl, Centre of Excellence
- Diversity Travel
- Numerical Algorithms Group
- Haskoning
