= Bruntwood =

British property company

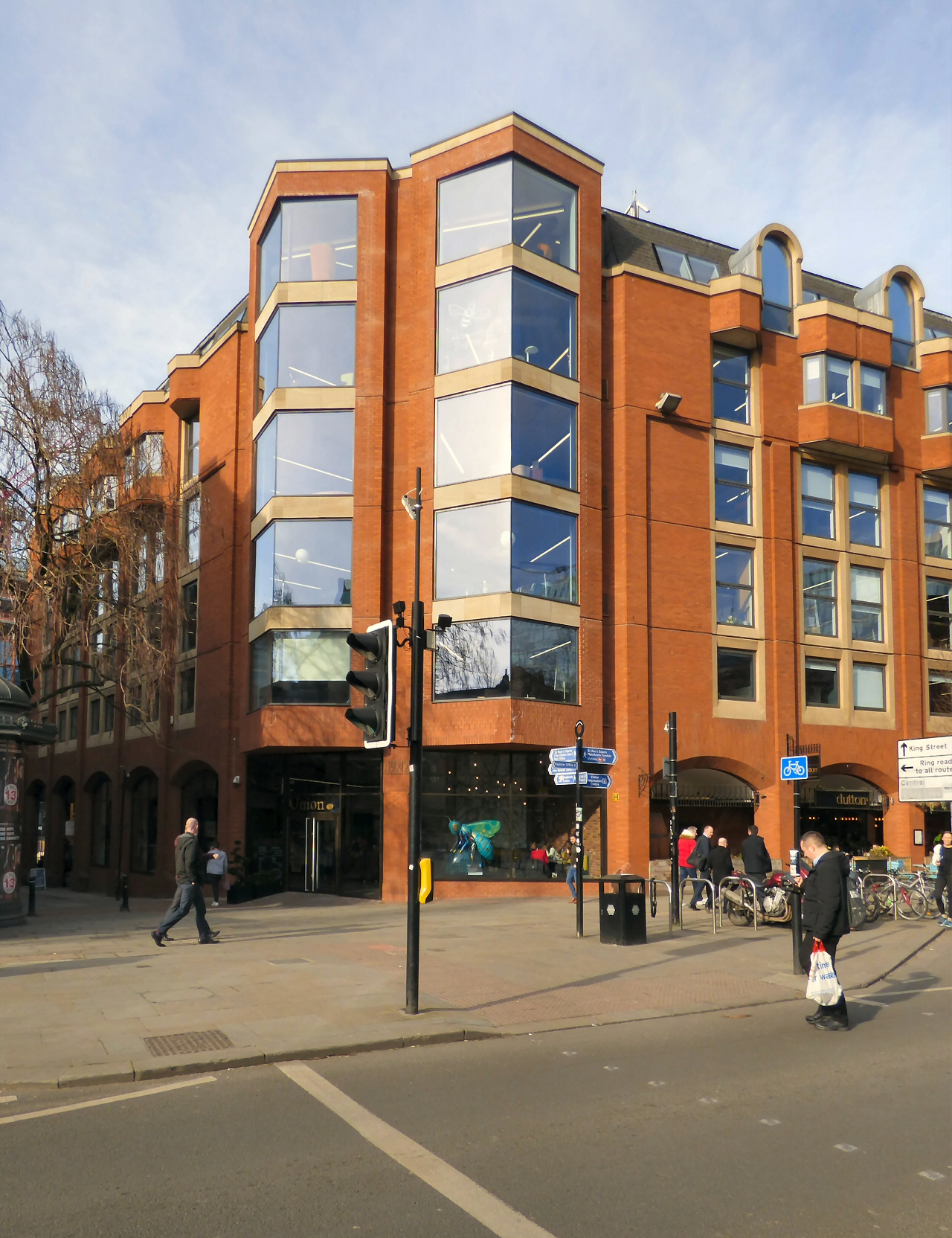
- Office at Union Building, Albert Square, Manchester
- Type: Private
- Industry: Property
- Founded: 1976
- Founder: Michael Oglesby
- Headquarters: Manchester, United Kingdom
- Key people: Chris Oglesby (Chief executive); Ciara Keeling (COO, Bruntwood SciTech); Andrew Butterworth (CCO, Bruntwood); Kevin Crotty (CFO, Bruntwood SciTech)
- Products: Office Space; Retail Space; Lab Space; Meeting Rooms; Event Space
- Number of employees: 700
- Parent: Bruntwood Group
- Subsidiaries: Bruntwood; Bruntwood SciTech; Unify by Bruntwood; Unify Energy
- Website: bruntwood.co.uk

Bruntwood is a family-owned property company offering office space, serviced offices, retail space and virtual offices in the north of England and Birmingham in the United Kingdom. They own several high-profile buildings in the Manchester area, as well as in Liverpool, Leeds and Birmingham.

Bruntwood's portfolio of over 100 properties is worth almost £2 billion and includes over 560,000 square metres (6,000,000 sq ft) of floorspace.

== Bruntwood SciTech ==
In October 2018, Bruntwood announced a 50:50 partnership with Legal & General Capital focussed on science and technology in regional cities. The new partnership has been named Bruntwood SciTech. Interests include Circle Square and Alderley Park.

The joint venture purchased grade II listed Pall Mall in Manchester for £13 million in 2021 and began a £33 million refurbishment in 2024, with the project being completed, and 90% of the office space being let, by 2026.

In 2026, Brentwood SciTech and the University of Manchester submitted plans for a 38 storey tower, that would provide student accommodation for 1,000 people in the Sister district. Sister is a £1.7 billion project to re-develop the University's north campus. Earlier work on the district included the refurbishment of the Renold Building.

== Properties ==
Notable properties in the Bruntwood group include:

=== Birmingham ===
- Centre City Tower
- The McLaren Building

=== Manchester city centre ===
- 111 Piccadilly
- Afflecks
- Bank Chambers
- Manchester One
- St. James Buildings

=== Greater Manchester and Cheshire ===
- Millennium House, Stockport
- Abney Hall, Cheadle
- Alderley Park

=== Liverpool ===
- Cotton Exchange
- Oriel Chambers
- The Plaza
