= 111 Piccadilly =

Office building in Manchester, England

Coordinates: 53.4792°N 2.2326°W

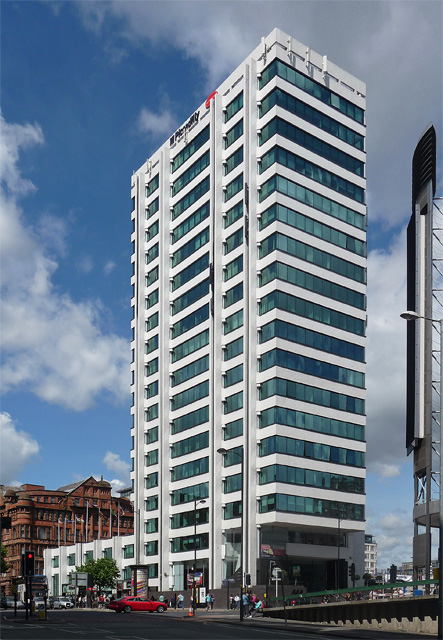
- 111 Piccadilly, at the end of Station Approach
- Former names: Rodwell Tower

General information
- Type: High-rise office
- Location: Manchester, England, 111 Piccadilly, Manchester, M1 2HY
- Construction started: 1962
- Completed: 1965
- Owner: Bruntwood

Height
- Height: 64 m (210 ft)

Technical details
- Floor count: 18
- Floor area: 50,000 sq ft (4,600 m^{2})

Design and construction
- Architects: Stephen & Partners

Website
- Official website

111 Piccadilly, formerly Rodwell Tower, is a high-rise office building in Manchester city centre, England. It opened in 1965 and is now owned by Bruntwood. The tower is 64 m (210 ft) tall, which makes it the joint 74th-tallest building in Greater Manchester as of 2023.

The building is located at the corner of Ducie Street (near Station Approach which leads to Manchester's main railway station, Manchester Piccadilly). It is the last building in Piccadilly which continues here as London Road.

== History ==
The architects of the tower were Douglas Stephen & Partners who had to solve the constructional problem of building a high building over the Rochdale Canal. Its external appearance is enhanced by the eight enormous columns which carry the building above the canal; however the rendered finish did not look so good after a few years of rain.

=== Refurbishment ===
In 2020, the developer Bruntwood completed a refurbishment programme on 111 Piccadilly, including a 200 ft (61 m) high photovoltaic lighting installation on three sides of the building. Other technology in the building includes sensors monitoring air quality, space utilisation and energy usage.
