= Westminster House, Manchester =

Building in Manchester, England

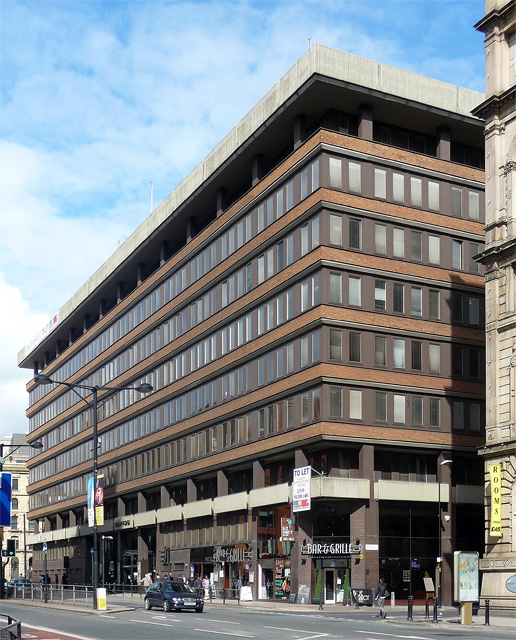
- Westminster House

- Location within Greater Manchester

General information
- Location: Portland Street, Manchester, United Kingdom
- Coordinates: 53.4796°N 2.2364°W
- Completed: 1973

Design and construction
- Architect: Fitzroy Robinson & Partners

Westminster House is a commercial building on the south east side of Portland Street, Manchester. As "County Hall", it was the headquarters of Greater Manchester County Council from its formation in April 1974 to its abolition in March 1986.

== History ==
In the mid-19th century, the site on the south east side of Portland Street had been occupied by a row of residential and retail properties which included the Portland Street Silk Mill; the area in the next block to the south east of the site (on the south east side of Major Street) was known at that time as Westminster Place and this may have been, in part, the origin of the name. The site itself continued to be occupied by the same aging residential and retail properties until the mid-20th century.

The building was initially called the Portland Centre and was speculatively built by private developers between 1971 and 1973 as an investment property. It was designed by Fitzroy Robinson & Partners and built at the cost of £4.5 million (£33,450,000 as of 2023).

The design for the seven-storey building involved a main frontage on Portland Street with wings stretching back along Minshull Street and Aytoun Street; the ground floor was designated for retail use and the windows on the first floor were slightly recessed; the upper floors featured a continuous bands of glazing with red brick above and below the glazing.

Greater Manchester County Council was initially established as a shadow authority in 1973 before formally coming into being on 1 April 1974. The shadow authority rented New Deansgate House on Deansgate in Manchester as temporary offices whilst looking for a permanent home. The county council subsequently took a lease of the Portland Centre, taking possession in January 1974, and renamed it County Hall. The council later bought the building from its previous owners, Hambro Life.

There was no council chamber at County Hall, so full council meetings were held at Manchester Town Hall.

The building was vacated by Greater Manchester County Council on its abolition in March 1986.

In 1988, the building was sold for circa £5 million to Parc Securities who refurbished it and converted it for commercial use. It was then sold on, in 1990, for circa £22 million to County Hall Properties who renamed it "Westminster House"; it was suggested in The Independent that this may have been, in part, to honour the Westminster Government of Margaret Thatcher which had abolished Greater Manchester County Council. The building was later acquired by Aviva Investors, who commissioned an extensive programme of refurbishment works costing £18 million which were carried out by contractors, Styles & Wood, to a design by BDP and completed in summer 2017. Following completion of the refurbishment works, the building was renamed again, this time simply to 11 Portland Street.
