= Herne Windmill =

Listed building in Kent, England

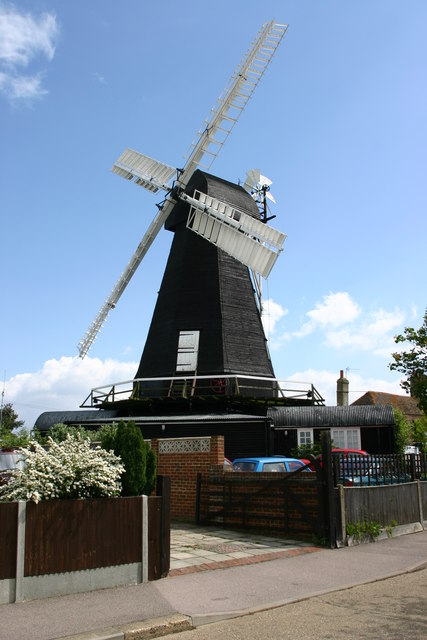
- Interactive map of Herne Windmill

Origin
- Grid reference: TR 185 665
- Coordinates: 51°21′19″N 1°8′13″E
- Operator: Kent County Council
- Year built: 1789

Information
- Purpose: Corn mill
- Type: Smock mill
- Storeys: Three-storey smock
- Base storeys: Two-storey base
- Smock sides: Eight-sided
- No. of sails: Four
- Type of sails: Double Patent sails
- Windshaft: Cast iron
- Winding: Fantail
- Fantail blades: Six blades
- Auxiliary power: Steam engine Oil engine Electric motor since 1952
- No. of pairs of millstones: Three
- Other information: Originally built on a single-storey base, raised in 1858 to two storeys

Herne Windmill is a Grade I listed smock mill in Herne, Kent, England, that was built in 1789.

== History ==
Herne Windmill was built by John Holman in 1789 when he was working for Sweetlove, the Wingham millwright. There are records of a windmill in Herne as early as 1405. The mill replaced an earlier post mill that was standing in 1511 and was marked on Philip Symonson's map of 1596, John Speed's map of 1611, Robert Morden's map of 1695, Emanuel Bowen's map of 1736 and Andrews, Drury and Herbert's map of 1769. In 1858, the mill was raised, and a two-storey brick base built underneath it. A new iron worm was fitted in 1931, replacing the old wooden one. In the 1930s, the mill was working on two sails only. Frank Wootton, the miller, sought the assistance of the Society for the Protection of Ancient Buildings (SPAB), and after Rex Wailes made a report on the mill, two sails from the Black Mill, Forncett End, Norfolk were fitted by Thomas Hunt of Soham, Cambridgeshire in 1936. A new pair of sails was constructed by Hunt, the work being made possible by support from SPAB, the Duchess of Kent and Trinity House. The latter assisted as the mill was marked as a navigational landmark for shipping. The mill worked by wind until 1952, assisted latterly by a steam engine, then an oil engine. After that date, milling was done with an electric motor supplying the power. Milling continued with the electric motor until 1980.

On 21 May 2020 the sails were removed during the first lockdown of the COVID-19 pandemic.

== Description ==
Herne Mill has a three-storey smock on a two-storey brick base. It has four double patent sails carried on a cast-iron windshaft, housed in a Kentish-style cap. The mill is winded by a fantail. There is a stage at a level between the first and second floor. The Brake Wheel is composite, with an iron centre and a wooden rim. It drives a wooden compass arm Wallower on a wooden Upright Shaft. This carries a wooden compass arm Great Spur Wheel. The mill drives three pairs of millstones overdrift.

New sails were fitted in 2004. These measure 33 ft 3 3/4 in (10.15 m) long by 5 ft 10 3/4 in (1.80 m) wide each, with a total span of 68 feet 8 inches (20.93 m). The work was carried out by IJP Millwrights of Binfield Heath, Berkshire.

== Millers ==
- Webb
- (Job) Lawrence & Sons (John and Edward) 1795 - 1879
- John Lawrence (nephew of Job) 1763 - 1840
- Edward Lawrence 1845 -
- Thomas Wootton 1879 - 1928
- Frank Wootton
- R C & E E Wootton
- Clive Wootton 1925 - 1980

Robert Wootton

References for above:-
