= 74–80 Portland Street =

Listed terrace in Manchester, England

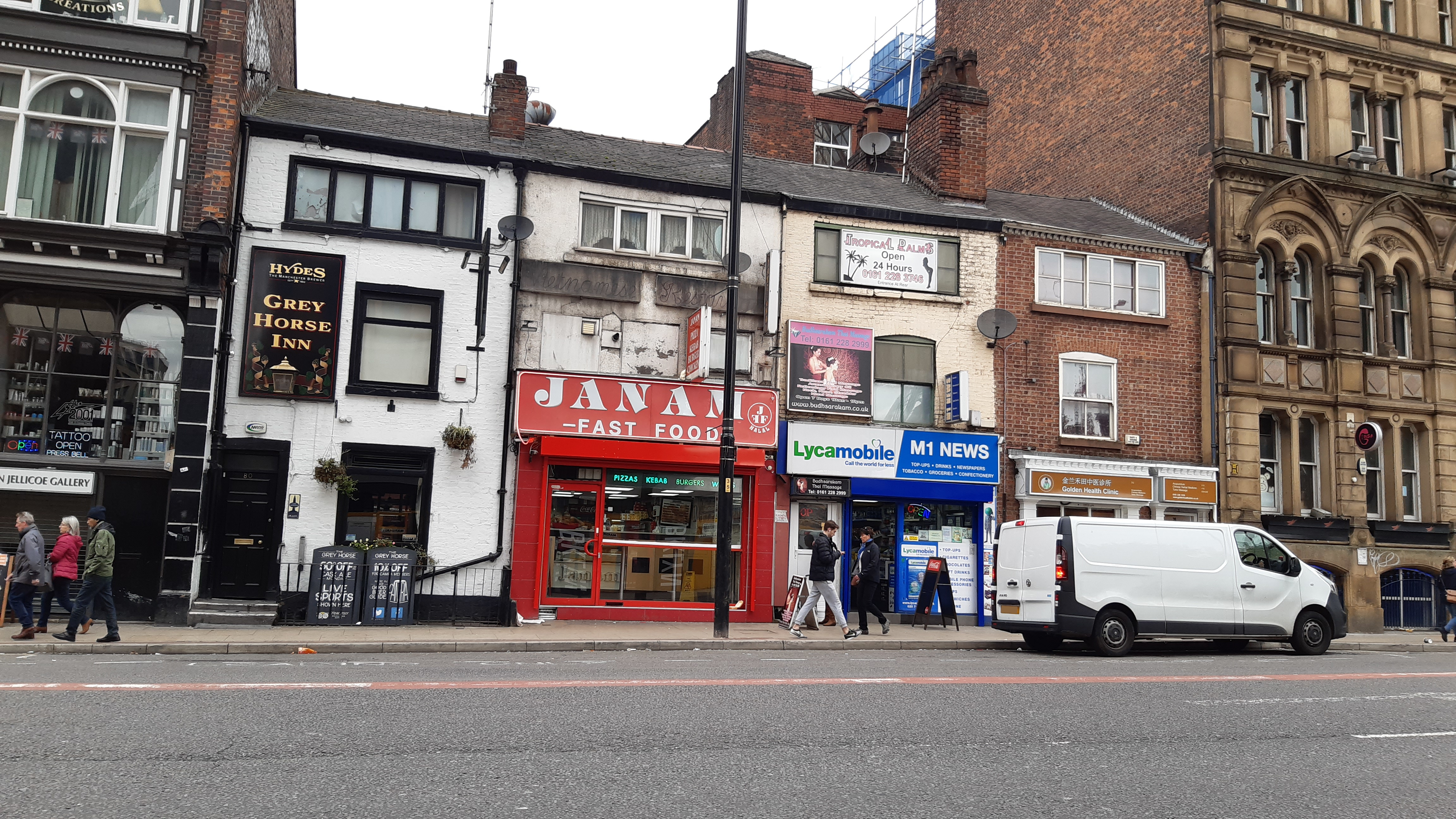
- 74–80 Portland Street in 2019

General information
- Type: Commercial and public house
- Location: Portland Street, Manchester, England
- Coordinates: 53.4779°N 2.2397°W
- Year built: Late 18th century (probable)

Design and construction
- Designations

Listed Building – Grade II
- Official name: Nos 74–78, and No 80 (The Grey Horse public house) and attached railings, Portland Street
- Designated: 6 June 1994
- Reference no.: 1246954

Other information
- Public transit: Manchester Oxford Road

Website
- Grey Horse Inn website

74–80 Portland Street is a Grade II listed terrace of four late-18th‑century former townhouses, now commercial buildings, on Portland Street in Manchester city centre, England. No. 80 has long been occupied by the Grey Horse Inn, a public house that is frequently noted as one of the smallest pubs in the city. The block forms part of the commercial corridor that developed along the street during the city's industrial expansion, when Portland Street became a major route lined with warehouses, offices, shops, and public houses.

== History ==
The terrace was probably constructed in the late 18th century and was subsequently altered. The form of the windows in the upper storeys suggests that the top floors of the terrace were originally used as weavers' workshops, or for other industrial purposes.

No. 80 Portland Street is occupied by the Grey Horse Inn, a long‑established public house and one of the smallest pubs in Manchester. The building forms the western end of the listed terrace and is three doors away from another small pub, the Circus Tavern.

Licensed premises have existed on the site since at least the mid-19th century. Despite significant redevelopment in the surrounding area, the Grey Horse Inn has remained in continuous use as a pub.

On 6 June 1994, the terrace was designated a Grade II listed building.

The Grey Horse Inn is currently operated by Hydes Brewery and is noted for its compact interior, narrow bar area, and traditional layout, features that reflect the constraints of the original building footprint. Its long‑standing presence and small scale have made it a recognised example of Manchester's surviving Victorian‑era pubs.

== Architecture ==
The buildings are painted brick (No. 78 has a rendered finish) with slate roofs, except No. 78, which has a felted covering. Each property has a double‑depth layout, a single‑fronted plan, and rear extensions. They rise three short storeys, with No. 80 also having a cellar. Each originally had one first‑floor window, though No. 78 now has three modern openings.

No. 80 has its doorway on the left, an altered ground‑floor window, and railings around what was once the cellar lightwell; the others now contain 20th‑century shopfronts. On the first floor, Nos. 74 and 76 each have one window with a shallow arched head (blocked at No. 74 and still a sash at No. 76). No. 78 has three inserted windows, and No. 80 has a two‑light casement.

At the top level, each building has a wide workshop‑style window: the one at No. 74 is blocked, No. 76 retains its original horizontal sliding sashes, No. 78 has been altered to a four‑light casement, and No. 80 now has a five‑light version. A large chimney stack stands on the front roof slope between Nos. 74 and 76, with a smaller one between the other pair.

== See also ==
- Listed buildings in Manchester-M1
- Listed pubs in Manchester
