= Micropub =

Very small, one room public house

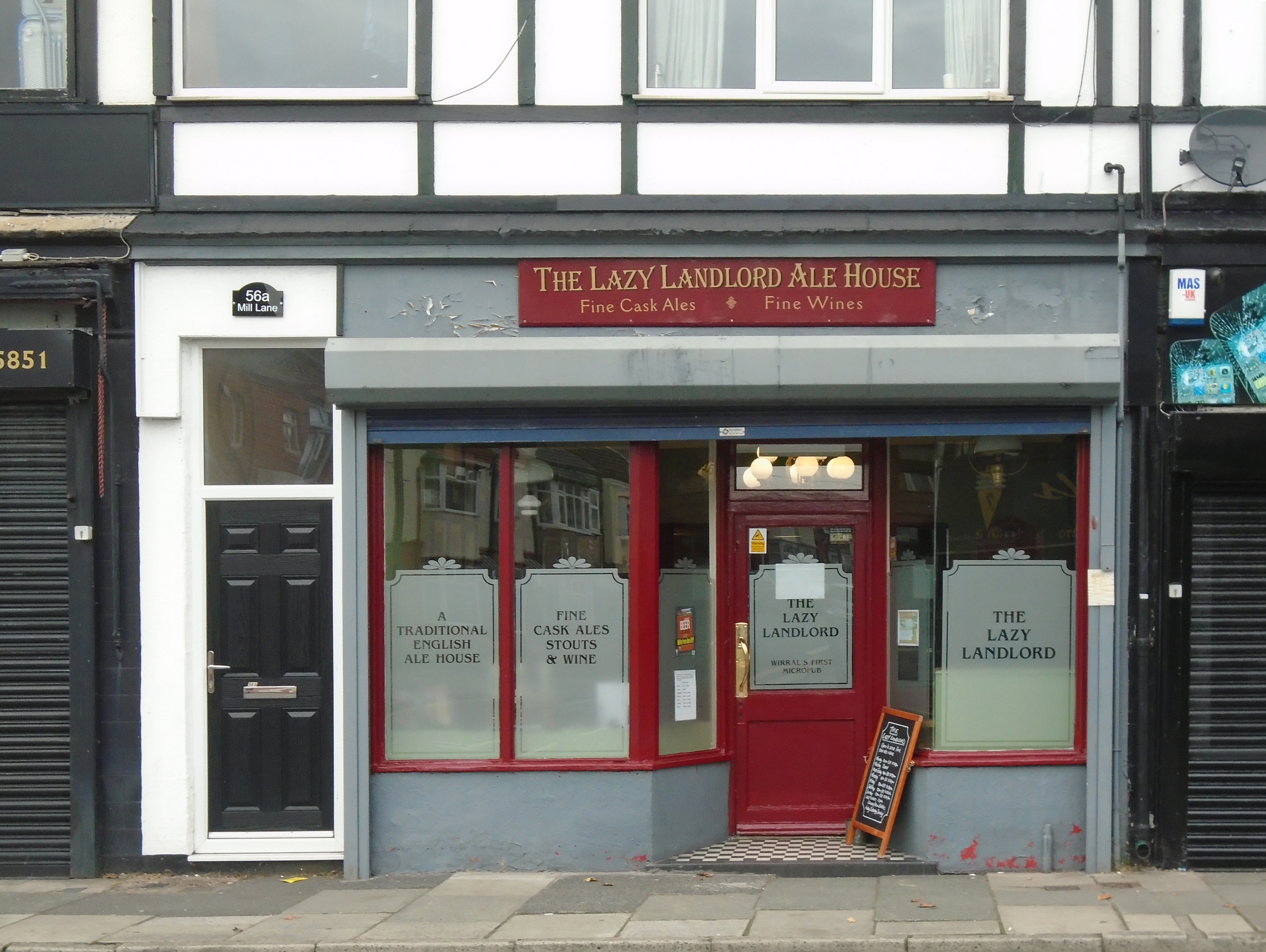
The Lazy Landlord Ale House, a micropub in Wallasey.

The term micropub was originally devised by the Campaign for Real Ale, in the 1976 edition of its Good Beer Guide, simply as a description for an unusually small but otherwise traditional pub. Examples of pubs described as such in this era included Manchester's Circus Tavern and The Nutshell in Bury St Edmunds. In more recent years, the term came to be redefined much more tightly, as a very small, modern, one-room pub, serving no food other than snacks, and "based upon good ale and lively banter". The original of these newly defined micropubs is often cited as the Butchers Arms in Herne, Kent.

== Definition ==
According to the Micropub Association, an organisation set up in 2012, a micropub is now defined as follows: "A micropub is a small freehouse which listens to its customers, mainly serves cask ales, promotes conversation, shuns all forms of electronic entertainment and dabbles in traditional pub snacks". The Micropub Association goes on to explain that a micropub may or may not have a bar, and might serve beer straight from the cask or through hand pumps, but share a philosophy: a simple pub with the focus on cask beer and conversation for entertainment.

This modern definition is not accepted by all pub campaigners, many of whom continue to use the term micropub simply to refer to any unusually small public house.

== History ==
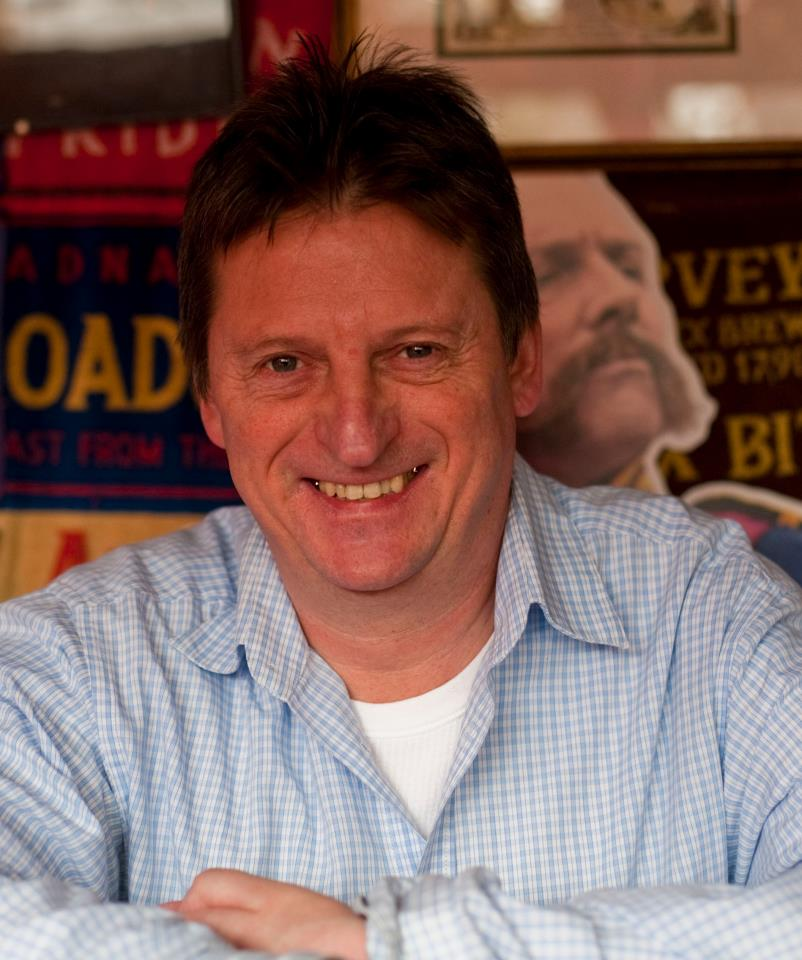
Martyn Hillier MBE of the Micropub Association

It became easier to set up a small independent pub in the United Kingdom following the passing of the 2003 Licensing Act, which became effective in 2005.

The Butchers Arms in Herne, Kent, was opened in 2005 by Martyn Hillier after spending several years as an off-licence, and to describe this new and novel style of pub, Hillier resurrected the term "micropub". In 2009, Hillier gave a presentation to the AGM of Campaign for Real Ale, in Eastbourne, outlining what he considered to be the simplicity of this new micropub model and encouraging other people to consider opening similar type establishments.

It proved to be a catalyst, with the Rat Race Ale House in Hartlepool six months later and Just Beer Micropub in Newark-on-Trent opening August 2010, soon after followed by The Conqueror Alehouse the same year. Since then, there have been several more micropubs opening such as The Just Reproach in Deal, Kent and the Bake & Alehouse in Westgate-on-Sea, Kent.

In June 2012, the Micropub Association was set up by Hillier along with Stu Hirst, as a resource for other would-be micropubs and to give free advice on the setting up and running of a successful micropub. Hillier wrote on his website:

"The Micropub Association will be a place where like-minded real ale lovers can share their micropub experiences. The Micropub Association will also be a platform for the new Micropubs to tell the beer drinking community about themselves. A successful Micropub is based upon good ale and lively banter and I want this to come across through the Micropub Association. Ultimately I’d like to think that we could become a useful lobby group to support the likes of CAMRA and SIBA, promoting the real ale experience".

From 1 October 2014 the Micropub Association launched its official micropub recognition scheme, which allows micropub owners to register as a Recognised Micropub Member. To qualify a micropub must commit to holding up the tenets and ethics of the Association's definition of what it means to be a micropub. Once accepted a personalised certificate, with one year's validity, is issued for display in the establishment to demonstrate to visitors that it is promoting the ethics and tenets of what it means to be a micropub. In 2015, Hillier was named Campaign for Real Ale campaigner of the year for launching the Micropub Association.

In April 2015, planning permission was granted to open the first micropub in Scotland, in Kelso in the Scottish Borders.

== Influence ==
In September 2012, CAMRA announced its 16 regional round winners of the 2012 National Pub of the Year (POTY) competition, amongst which were two modern micropubs, Just Beer in Newark, Nottinghamshire, (East Midlands regional winner) and The Conqueror Alehouse in Ramsgate, Kent, (Kent regional winner). In November 2012, CAMRA announced that The Conqueror Alehouse had been chosen to be one of the four finalists in this competition. In September 2014, CAMRA announced its 16 regional round winners of the 2014 National Pub of the Year (POTY) competition, amongst which was a micropub, The Door Hinge in Welling (Greater London regional winner).

Whilst micropubs constitute only 0.4% of all pubs that sell real ale, three of the CAMRA Top Sixteen pubs in its 2015 National Pub of the Year competition were micropubs, Hail to the Ale, One Inn The Wood and Yard of Ale. In November 2015, CAMRA announced that Yard of Ale (Kent regional winner) had been chosen to be one of the four finalists in this competition.

In April 2015, CAMRA announced that Martyn Hillier had been chosen as the Campaigner of the Year at its 2015 AGM for his work giving advice to others interested in establishing new pubs and for founding the Micropub Association.

In the New Year Year's Honours List 2024 Martyn Hillier was awarded an MBE described as Founder, Micropub Association. For services to Business and to Hospitality.

== Literature ==
In March 2017, the first book devoted solely to micropubs was published. "The Micropub Guide : Enjoying the pint-sized pub revolution" is a 350-page paperback published by Duncan Petersen, which describes the concept, its history and development, with venue listings and has a foreword written by Martyn Hillier.

== See also ==
- List of bars
- List of public house topics
