= Bank Chambers =

Office building in Manchester, England

Coordinates: 53.47920°N 2.23812°W

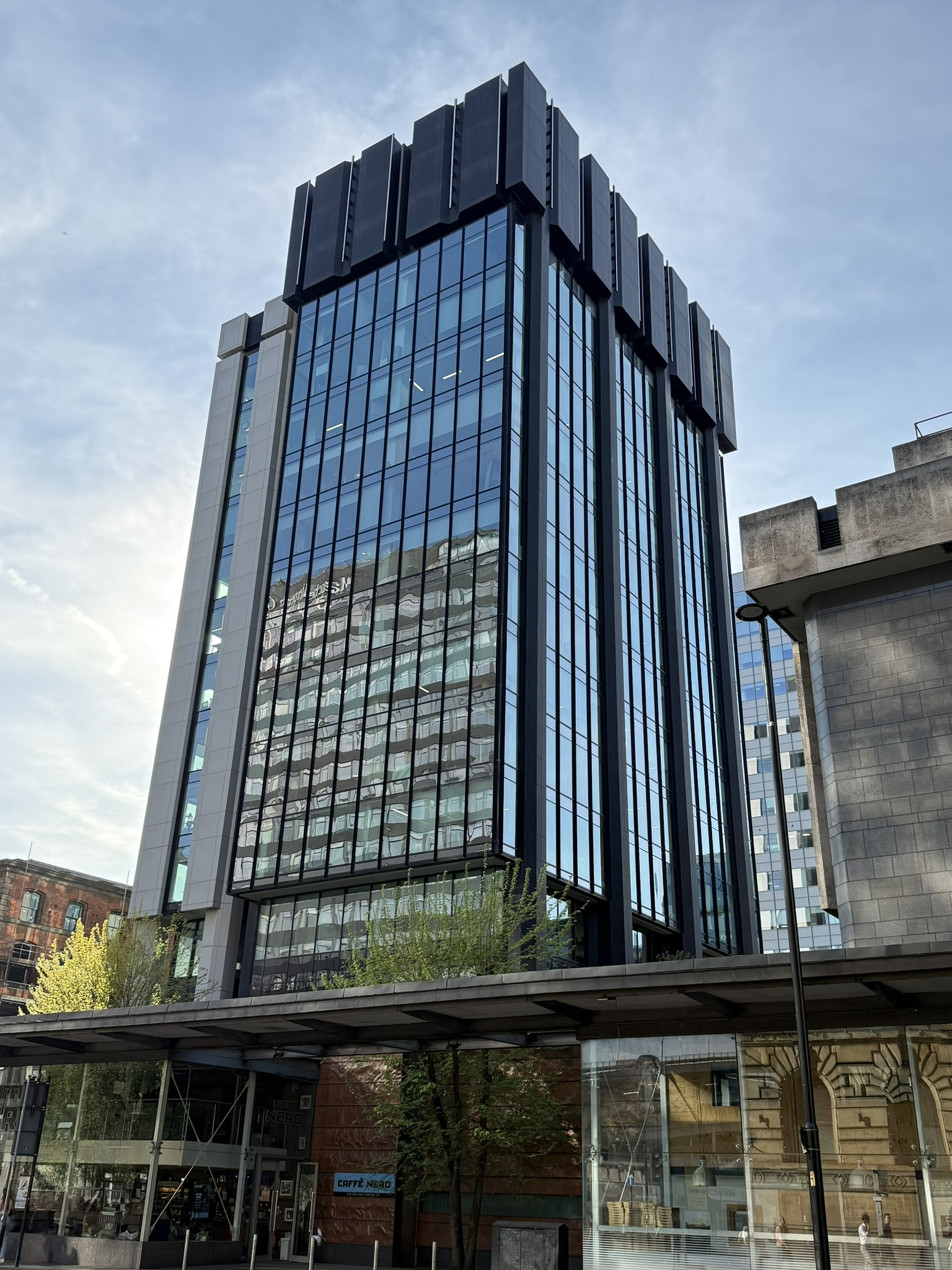
Bank Chambers from Portland Street (April 2025)

Bank Chambers is an office building on Portland Street, Manchester, England. Its heavy and imposing appearance gives away its previous use as a bullion bank vault by the Bank of England. The Bank of England vacated the building in the 1990s and the building is now used as offices.

== Background ==
The building was built in 1971 and designed by the architecture practice Aukett Fitzroy Robertson. The building is bomb-proof with a 16-inch exterior wall of concrete and wide cavity existed for security patrols. Every Tuesday the surrounding roads would be temporarily closed to allow the transporting of money.

The building was vacated in the 1990s and office developer Bruntwood bought the building. It was subsequently renovated with Grade A office space. The existing vault space has since been converted into space for servers and data farms for companies.
