= Abney Hall =

Listed building in Greater Manchester, England

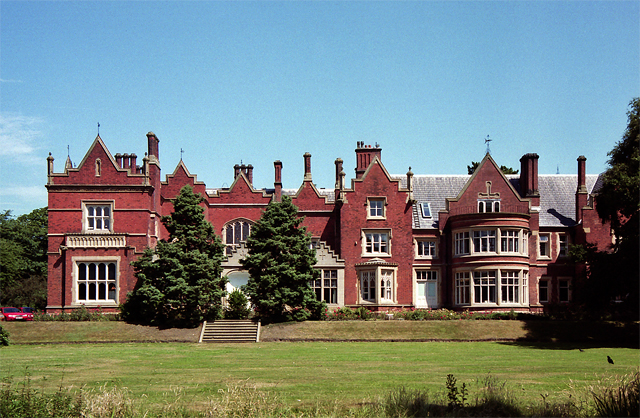
- The south face of Abney Hall looking north

- Location within Greater Manchester

General information
- Architectural style: Neo-Norman, Tudor Gothic
- Location: Manchester Road, Cheadle, Greater Manchester, England
- Coordinates: 53.399493°N 2.211258°W
- Construction started: 1842
- Completed: 1847
- Renovated: Mid and late 19th century (remodelled)

Design and construction
- Designations

Listed Building – Grade II*
- Official name: Abney Hall
- Designated: 29 June 1975
- Reference no.: 1241730

Website
- Official website

Abney Hall is a Grade II* listed Victorian house on Manchester Road in Cheadle, a suburban village within the Metropolitan Borough of Stockport, Greater Manchester, England. Built between 1842 and 1847 and extensively remodelled in the mid and late 19th century, it later became a civic building and now serves as offices within a public park. The hall is noted for its associations with the Watts family and for its influence on the works of Agatha Christie, who frequently visited the house.

== History ==
=== Early history ===
The foundations of the hall were laid in 1842 on the site of Cheadle Grove Print Works, which had been built in 1760 and which later burned down; the hall was completed in 1847 but remodelled in the 1850s and considerably extended in the 1890s. It was originally called 'The Grove' after the print works and was going to have been the home of a mayor of Stockport, Alfred Orell, but he died in the year of its completion. The house and the associated estate (gardens and farmland) were sold to James Watts (later Sir James Watts) who rebuilt the upper storey and added two short wings in the early 1850s. The architects for the alterations were Travis and Magnall, the Manchester firm which also designed the Watts Warehouse on Portland Street in Manchester. However, the work by Travis and Magnall was hardly complete, when James Watts was inspired to engage the architect and designer A. W. N. Pugin and his colleagues, who had created the Gothic Court at the 1851 Great Exhibition in the Crystal Palace, to make further substantial alterations.

James Watts was responsible for renaming it 'Abney Hall' after, in the words of his son, "Sir Thomas Abney who entertained Sir [actually Rev. Dr.] Isaac Watts for thirty years".

In the 1890s, Abney Hall was further altered and substantially extended by the architect and interior designer George Faulkner Armitage (1849–1937).

In 1912 a valuation and inventory was taken for insurance purposes by Waring & Gillow Ltd who valued the contents of Abney Hall and Buckley Hall (a detached stone and lime building within the grounds that was demolished in 1963) at £13,150 5s 0d.

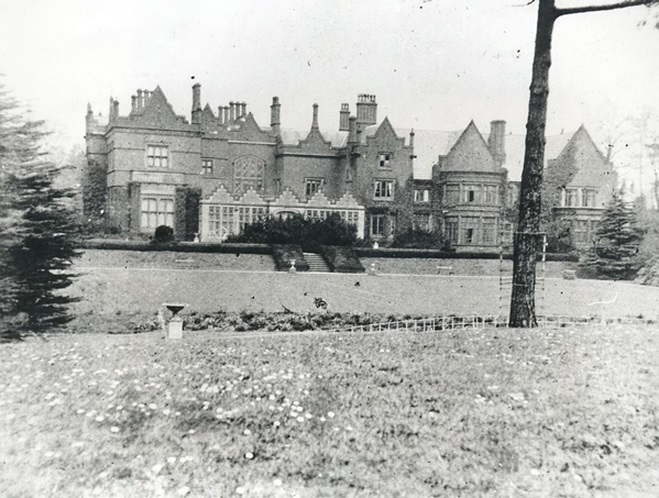
Abney Hall 1913

=== Later history ===
After his parents died, James Watts sold Abney Hall in 1958 for £14,000 to Cheadle and Gatley Urban District Council, which adapted it and opened it as Cheadle Town Hall in 1959. Stockport Metropolitan Borough Council took it over in 1974 and moved much of the remaining historical furniture from the hall to Bramall Hall and Lyme Hall. Parts of the grounds were sold until about a tenth of the original area remains. The hall is used as offices, though it is generally opened to the public under the auspices of the Civic Trust's Heritage Open Days scheme in September, and the grounds are open to the public all year round. The hall is mostly locked to the public since recent years due to the offices, with hall owners Bruntwood renovating the hall in 2014 and APS relocating their offices into the hall in September 2014. During filming for BBC drama series Our Zoo in April 2014, flagstones surrounding Abney Hall were accidentally damaged. Developments continued on the hall's grounds, with the September 2015 opening of the Abney Court Care Home built in the former walled garden of Abney Hall.

== Agatha Christie ==
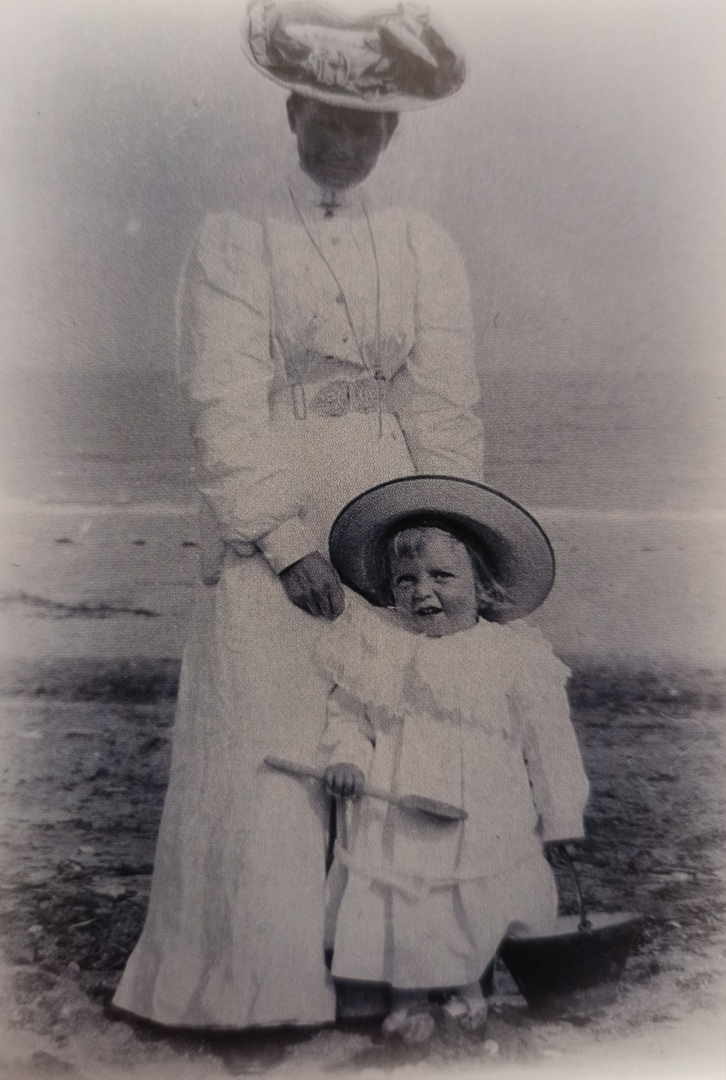
Sir James Watts' great grandson, James Watts, was the last private owner of Abney Hall and the only nephew of Agatha Christie. He was elected as Member of Parliament in 1959, but died in office two years later, aged 57.

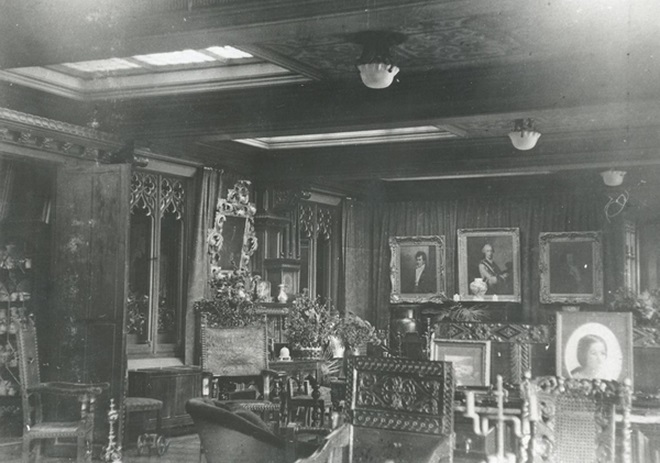
The Terrace Room, 1913

The last private owner of Abney Hall was the great grandson of Sir James Watts (1804–1878). He was also named James Watts and was the only nephew of Agatha Christie; his father, also named James Watts, married Agatha's sister, Margaret Frary Miller, in 1902. Christie often visited the hall and wrote two stories from there: the novel After the Funeral and the short story "The Adventure of the Christmas Pudding", which is part of a collection of short stories of the same name. The hall was also used as a basis for Chimneys, a country house and seat of the fictional Marquesses of Caterham, in The Secret of Chimneys (Christie dedicated this novel to her nephew) and The Seven Dials Mystery. Many references to various places around Cheadle can be found in her books. Vanessa Wagstaff writes,

Abney became Agatha's greatest inspiration for country-house life, with all the servants and grandeur which have been woven into her plots. The descriptions of the fictional Styles, Chimneys, Stoneygates and the other houses in her stories are mostly Abney in various forms.

== Visitors ==
Abney Hall has received a number of notable visitors. In 1857 Prince Albert visited during a two‑day trip to Manchester and described it as "one of the most princely mansions in the neighbourhood". Agatha Christie often stayed at the hall when visiting her nephew, James Watts, its last private owner. Other distinguished guests included Benjamin Disraeli, E. M. Forster, and William Ewart Gladstone.

== Grounds ==
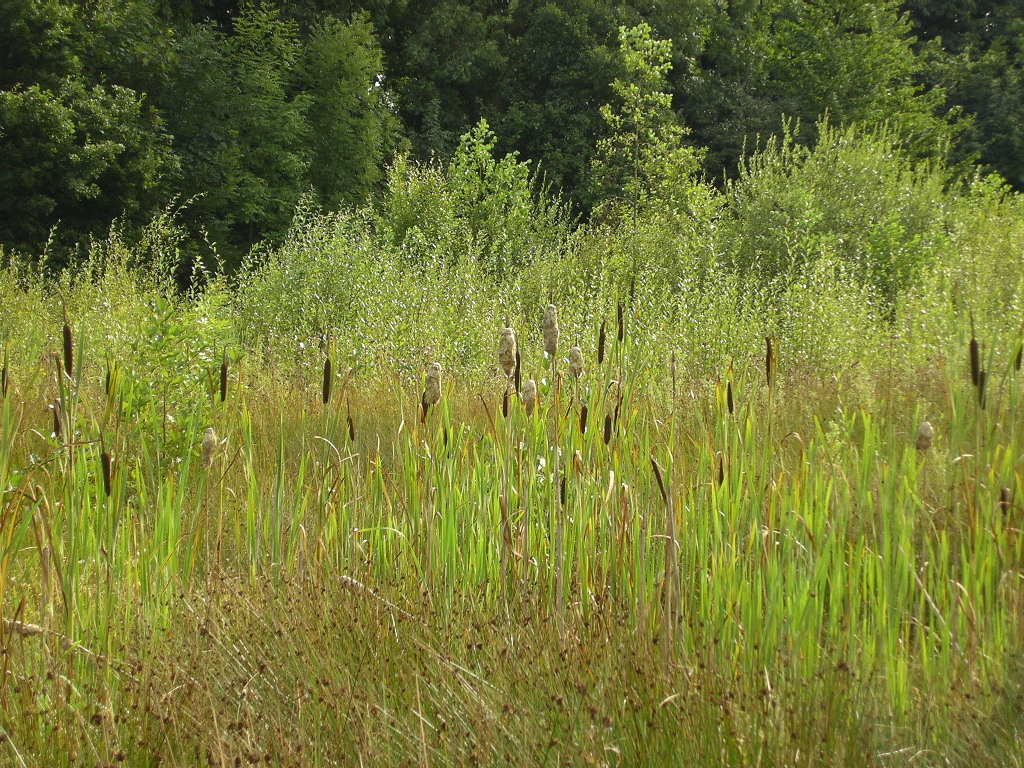
Wetlands in the grounds of Abney Hall

The park is a Local Nature Reserve. It was originally part of the Mersey flood plain, and much of the land is still very damp. This land has now formed wet meadows, which are becoming increasingly rare in Stockport as land is drained for development. Abney Hall is one of the few places in Stockport to feature such wetlands. There is also a small café called Abney Garden Teas in the Abney Centre in the centre of the park.

== See also ==
- Grade II* listed buildings in Greater Manchester
- Listed buildings in Cheadle and Gatley
