= Frank Taylor (British politician) =

Frank Henry Taylor (10 October 1907 – 1 October 2003) was a Conservative Party politician in the United Kingdom who was the member of parliament for the Manchester Moss Side constituency from 1961 to 1974.

He had unsuccessfully fought Newcastle-under-Lyme in 1955. He was elected for Moss Side in a by-election in 1961 caused by the death of the Conservative incumbent James Watts, and held the seat until he was defeated by Labour's Frank Hatton in February 1974, partly due to Taylor's seat having been merged with part of Hatton's former seat of Manchester Exchange.

Parliament of the United Kingdom
Preceded by James Watts	Member of Parliament for Manchester Moss Side; 1961–Feb 1974	Succeeded by Frank Hatton
