= 1961 Manchester Moss Side by-election =

UK parliamentary by-election

The 1961 Manchester Moss Side by-election of 7 November 1961 was held after the death of Conservative Member of Parliament (MP) James Watts on 7 July that year. The seat was retained by the Conservatives.

== Candidates ==
The local Liberals selected 37-year-old solicitor Ruslyn Hargreaves. He was born in August 1923 and educated at William Hulme's Grammar School and Manchester University. He was formerly secretary of the National League of Young Liberals. He had been Liberal candidate for Howden at the 1959 general election. Max Mosley was an election agent for the Union Movement.

== Result ==
Manchester Moss Side, 1961
Party	Candidate	Votes	%	±%
Conservative	Frank Taylor	9,533	41.1	−21.2
Liberal	Ruslyn Hargreaves	6,447	27.8	New
Labour	Gordon Oakes	5,980	25.8	−11.9
Union Movement	Walter Hesketh	1,212	5.2	New
Majority		3,086	13.3	−11.3
Turnout		23,172		
Conservative hold		Swing		
