= Felicity Peake =

RAF officer (1913–2002)

Dame Felicity Peake
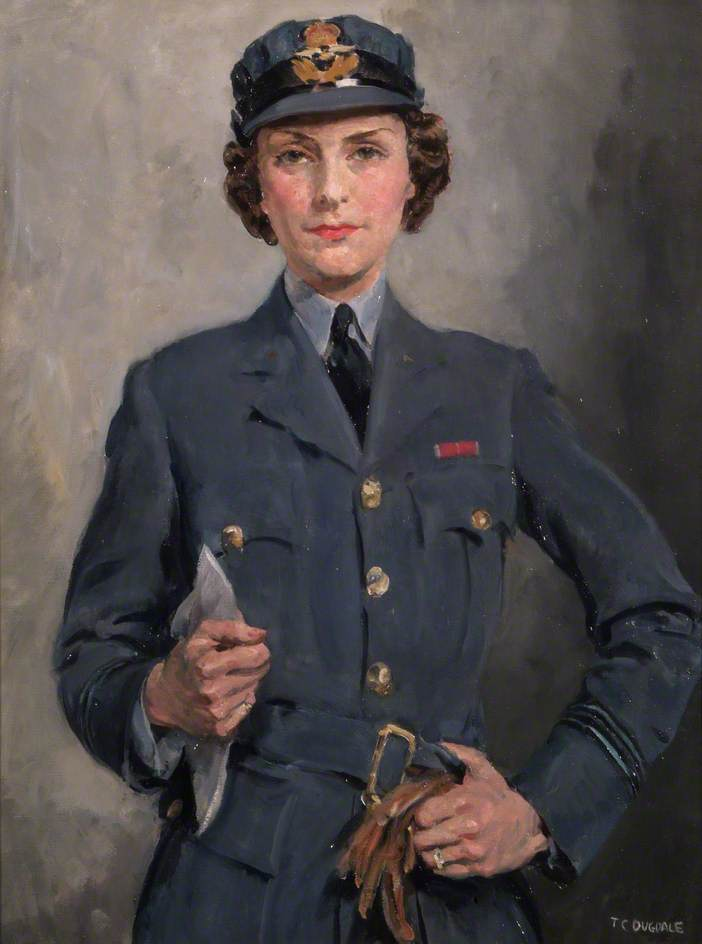
- Peake in around 1941, by Thomas Cantrell Dugdale
- Born: Felicity Hyde Watts; 1 May 1913; Cheadle Hulme, Stockport, England
- Died: 2 November 2002 (aged 89)
- Relatives: James Watts (great-grandfather); Margaret Watts (aunt); James Watts (cousin)
- Military career
- Allegiance: United Kingdom
- Branch: Women's Auxiliary Air Force; Women's Royal Air Force
- Service years: 1939–1950
- Rank: Air Commandant
- Commands: Women's Auxiliary Air Force (1946–49); Women's Royal Air Force (1949–50)
- Conflicts: Second World War
- Awards: Dame Commander of the Order of the British Empire

Air Commandant Dame Felicity Hyde, Lady Peake DBE (née Watts; 1 May 1913 – 2 November 2002) was the founding director of the Women's Royal Air Force (WRAF) She started flying when her first husband took up the hobby in 1935, but in 1946 became the first director of the WRAF. She was Honorary Aide-de-camp to King George VI from 1949 to 1950.

== Early years and career ==
Peake spent much of her youth at Haslington Hall, an Elizabethan house near Crewe, bought by her father after the First World War. Her father, Colonel Humphrey Watts, was a prosperous Manchester-based industrialist whose family's wealth derived from S & J Watts, a textile business founded in 1798.

Peake was educated at St. Winifred's, Eastbourne, but left before taking her school certificate to go on to a finishing school outside Paris. She met Jock Hanbury, a member of the Truman, Hanbury, Buxton & Co brewing family (whose hobby was flying), while on a cruise to the West Indies. They were married at St Margaret's, Westminster in 1935 and she was known as Felicity Hanbury; that same year she qualified for her pilot's licence.

With war looming, Jock Hanbury joined the auxiliary air force as a fighter pilot, but Felicity was prevented from joining the Air Transport Auxiliary after it was formed in 1940 by her lack of solo flying hours. She volunteered for No. 9 Auxiliary Territorial Service company of the RAF. Called up on 1 September 1939, she became a company assistant (the equivalent of a Pilot Officer), just a month before her husband was killed when his plane crashed in Surrey during a night-flying exercise. After a short spell as a code and cipher officer, in May 1940 she was posted to Biggin Hill where she was responsible for 250 officers. On 30 August 1940 she had the task of recovering from an attack when a bomb fell off an air raid shelter and 39 people died. Her experience here was used as the basis of Susannah York's character, Maggie Harvey, in the 1969 film Battle of Britain where the character counts the bodies of WAAF members. After the real raid Peake went from door to door in the nearby village to find billets for the aircrew who were now homeless. She was credited with helping to retain the airfield's ability to operate and this contributed to her being appointed a Member of the Order of the British Empire.

In January 1941, Peake joined the Women's Auxiliary Air Force (WAAF) recruiting staff at the Air Ministry, later moving to public relations duties, where she was adept at persuading senior RAF officers of the importance of expanding the role of women with more opportunities and greater responsibilities. It was here that she met her second husband, Air Commodore Harald Peake (later Sir Harald Peake), then director of RAF public relations and later chairman of Lloyds Bank and the Steel Company of Wales, whom she married in 1952.

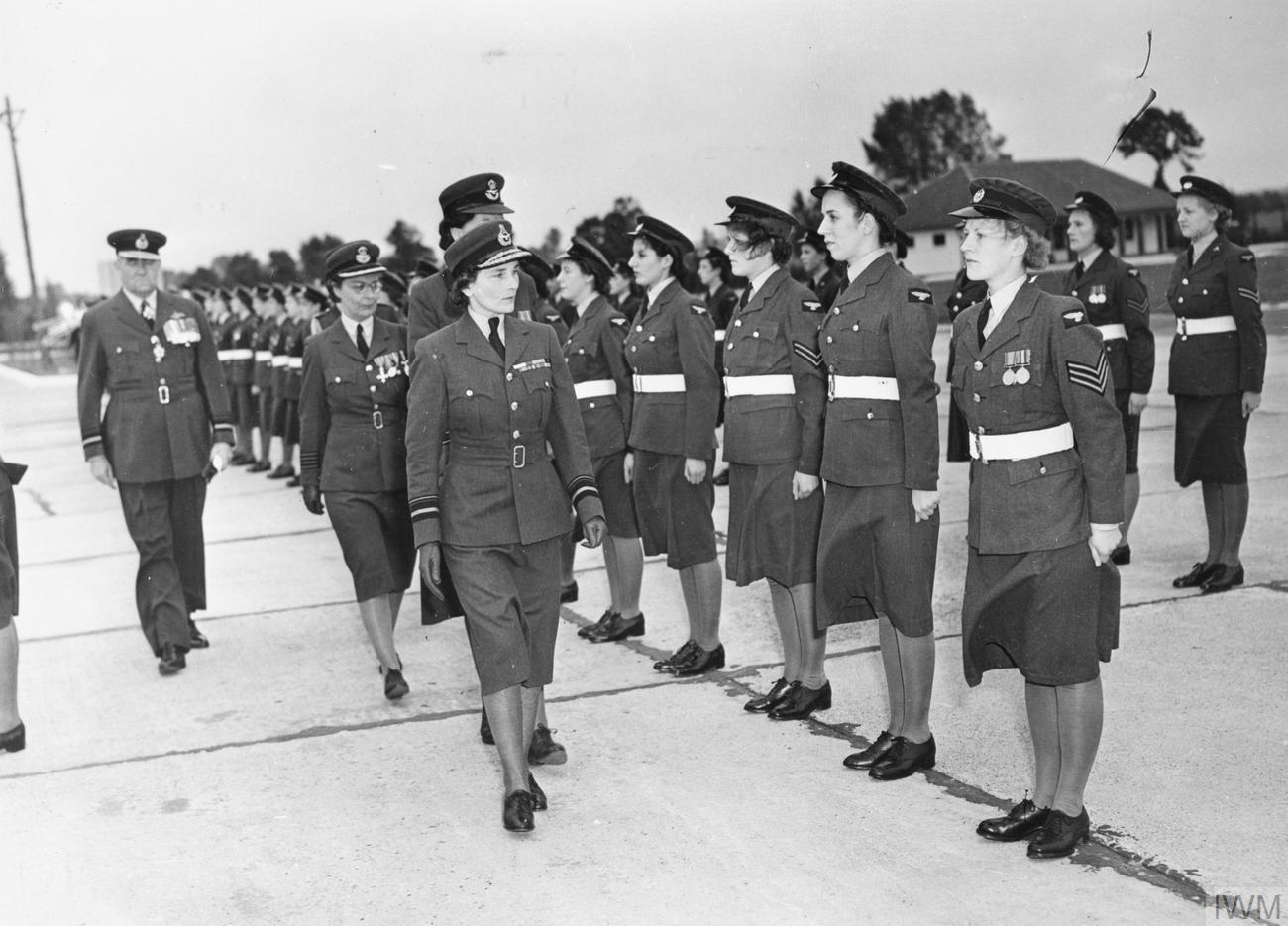
During the Berlin Airlift in 1948. She is following The Duchess of Gloucester, Commander in Chief BAFO, Sir Thomas Williams and WRAF Command Staff Officer, Group Officer Conan Doyle as they inspect the WRAF contingent at Gatow.

During her time at the Air Ministry, Peake forged lasting friendships with many of the most senior RAF officers – friendships that she used to great effect in retirement when furthering the interests of the RAF Benevolent Fund, the RAF church of St Clement Danes and the Imperial War Museum. In 1943, she became deputy WAAF administration staff officer at Bomber Command. This was followed by promotion to Wing Officer (equivalent to Wing Commander) and command of the WAAF officers' school at Windermere. In 1944, she was appointed senior WAAF staff officer with responsibility for the welfare of women radar operators, and, in 1945, with the rank of Group Officer (Group Gaptain), she became senior WAAF staff officer to the C-in-C Mediterranean and Middle East Command, in Cairo. She became the Director of the Women's Auxiliary Air Force on 12 October 1946 with the rank of Air Commandant (Air Commodore).

== Post-WAAF ==
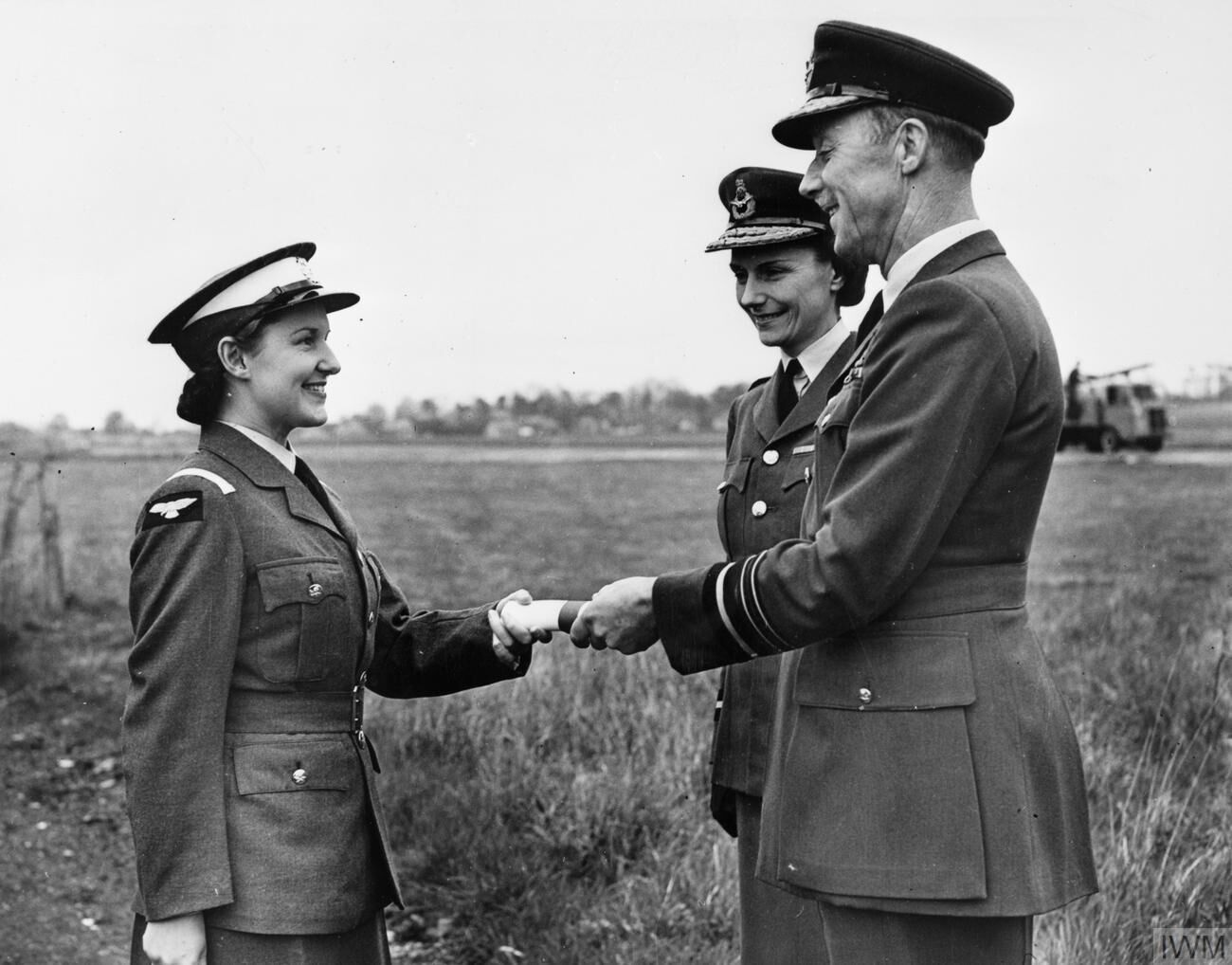
The Best Cadet receives her certificate from Air Marshal Sir Arthur Sanders and Air Commandant Dame Felicity Hanbury, Director of the Women's Royal Air Force, at Hawkinge, circa 1949–1950

As the last director of the WAAF, and the first director of the WRAF in February 1949, Peake steered the service through the difficult transition to its peacetime role. She was advanced to Dame Commander of the Order of the British Empire in 1949.

Following her retirement in 1950, Peake joined the board of the Truman, Hanbury and Buxton brewery, a job she described in her memoirs, Pure Chance (1993), as "sheer bliss": there was no "buck passing", no red tape, and she could get things done. She and her husband, Harald, bought a farm in Oxfordshire, where they bred pedigree Ayrshires and Jerseys, and a house in the south of France.

Appointed a trustee of the Imperial War Museum in 1963, she was its chairman from 1986 to 1988. She founded the Friends of the Imperial War Museum, later becoming its president.

== Family ==
Her husband Harald was knighted in the 1973 New Year Honours and died in 1978. Dame Felicity died in 2002, aged 89; she was survived by their son, Andrew.

Peake's father, Colonel Humphrey Watts, was the brother of British businessman James Watts, who married Margaret Miller, sister of author Agatha Christie. They had one child, Conservative party politician and member of Parliament for Manchester Moss Side James Watts, who was Peake's cousin.
