= Millennium House =

Listed building in Stockport, England

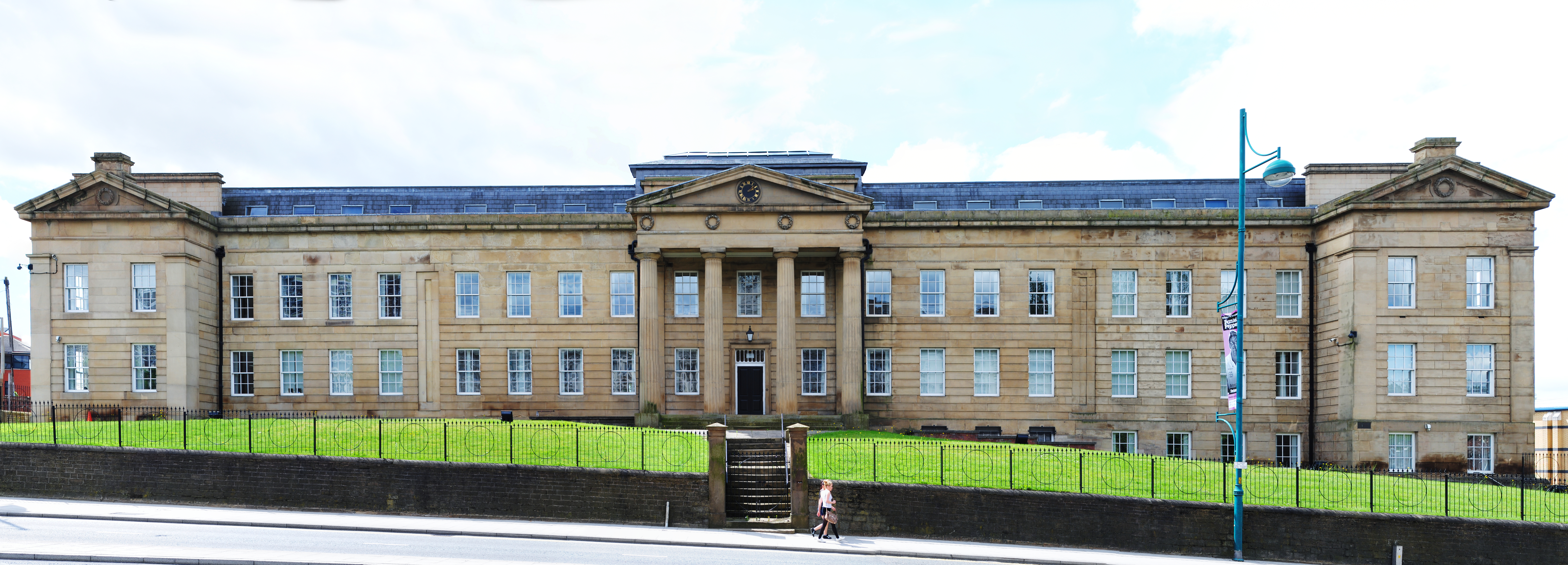
- Millennium House, from the bottom of the steps of Stockport Town Hall in 2012

- Location within Greater Manchester
- Former names: Stockport Infirmary, Stockport Dispensary

General information
- Status: Converted to offices
- Type: Dispensary and infirmary (former)
- Architectural style: Greek Revival
- Location: Wellington Road South, Stockport, Greater Manchester, England
- Coordinates: 53.4057°N 2.1596°W
- Current tenants: UK Pension Service
- Opened: 1792 (dispensary); 1833 (infirmary)
- Renovated: 2002
- Renovation cost: £4,500,000
- Owner: Bruntwood

Height
- Top floor: 2

Technical details
- Floor count: 4 (basement, 2 floors and attic)
- Floor area: 40,000 square feet (3,700 m^{2})

Design and construction
- Architect: Richard Lane
- Designations

Listed Building – Grade II
- Official name: Stockport Infirmary
- Designated: 10 March 1975
- Reference no.: 1309376

Website
- Official website

Millennium House is a Grade II listed building on Wellington Road South in Stockport, Greater Manchester, England.

== History ==
The building was established as a dispensary in 1792 and incorporated as an infirmary in 1833. The infirmary was then expanded four times between 1871 and 1926. In 1921−1922 the Sykes Ward for children was built. Tile pictures, signed by the artist Peter O'Brien, were installed in the ward in 1958. From 1926 the buildings themselves remained unchanged until the hospital closure in 1996.

On 10 March 1975, Stockport Infirmary was designated a Grade II listed building.

The building was purchased by the property company Bruntwood and renovated into office space in 2002, currently used by the Government's Department for Work and Pensions (DWP).

== See also ==
- Listed buildings in Stockport
