= Circus Tavern, Manchester =

Listed pub in Manchester, England

Circus Tavern
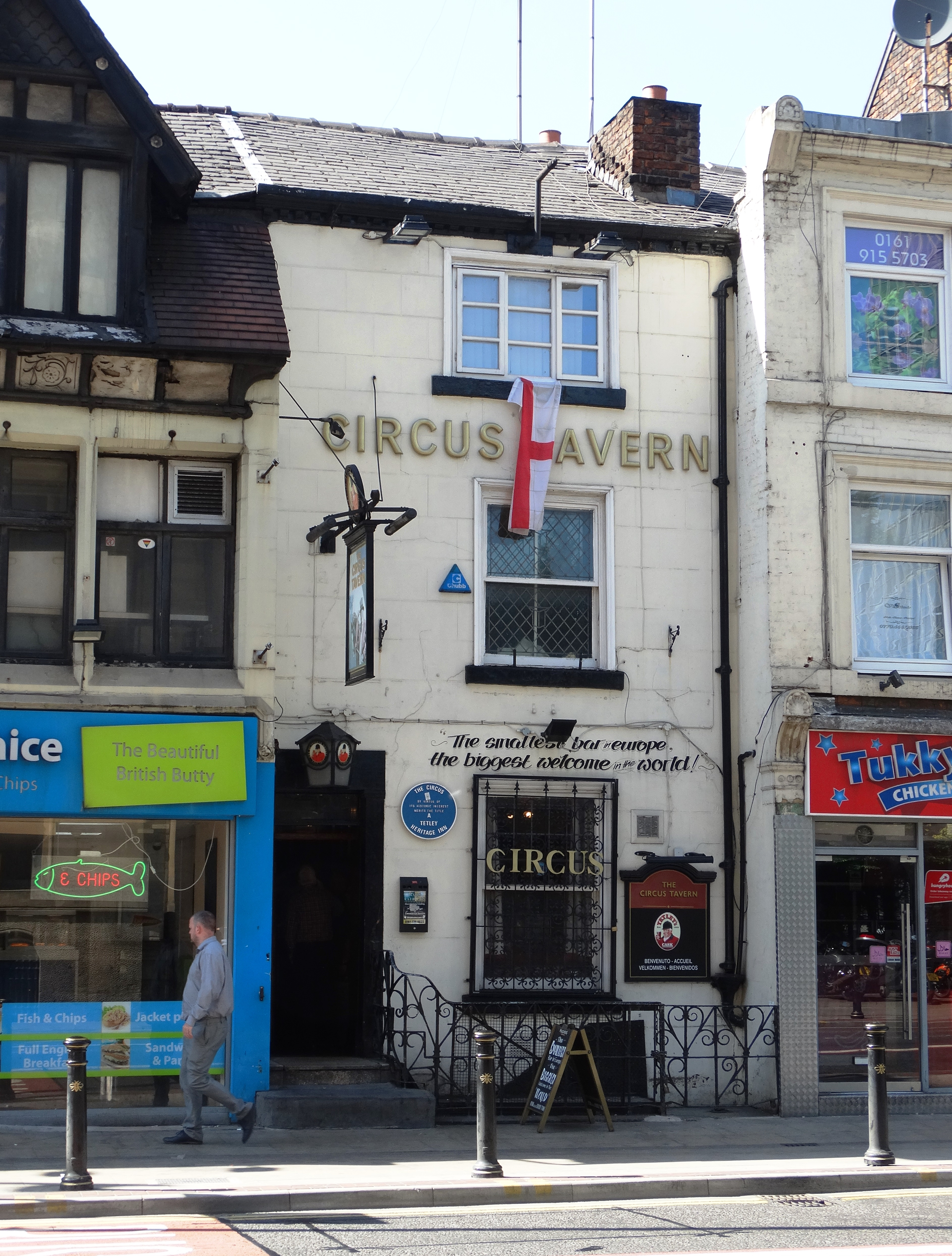
- The pub in 2016

General information
- Type: Public house
- Location: 86 Portland Street, Manchester, England
- Coordinates: 53.4778°N 2.2400°W
- Year built: Late 18th or early 19th century
- Renovated: Late 19th century (extended and remodelled)
- Owner: Heineken UK

Design and construction
- Designations

Listed Building – Grade II
- Official name: Circus Tavern and attached railings
- Designated: 6 June 1994
- Reference no.: 1247057

Other information
- Public transit: Manchester Oxford Road

The Circus Tavern is a Grade II listed public house on Portland Street in Manchester, England. Originally built as a house in the late 18th or early 19th century, it was later extended and converted into a pub, becoming established in that role by about 1840. It is reputedly one of the oldest pubs in the city and is known for its exceptionally small bar, which measures around 1 metre (3 ft 3 in) in length. Its interior is rated three stars by the Campaign for Real Ale (CAMRA) for its "outstanding national historic importance". The pub contains photographs of former Manchester United players who frequented it, and its freehold is owned by Heineken UK as of 2026.

== History ==
The building was constructed in the late 18th or early 19th century and was originally a house, according to its official listing. (Note: Another sources gives a construction date of 1790.) A rear extension was added in the later 19th century, and internal alterations were made when it was converted into a public house. It is reputedly one of the oldest pubs in Manchester, although it did not become a pub until about 1840. The Crown Tavern was acquired by Tetley's, a Yorkshire brewery, in 1842. The 1922 and 1934 Ordnance Survey maps show the building but without a designation or attributed name.

The pub displays a claim on its frontage that it contains the smallest bar in Europe. The bar itself is extremely small, measuring about 1 metre (3 ft 3 in) in length and accommodating only a single staff member. The pub is also among the smallest in the city, comparable in size to the nearby Grey Horse Inn three doors away.

On 6 June 1994, the Circus Tavern was designated a Grade II listed building. Its interior is recognised by the Campaign for Real Ale (CAMRA) with a three‑star rating, indicating that it is considered to be of "outstanding national historic importance". The pub contains photographs of former Manchester United players who frequented it, including George Best. As of June 2026, the pub's freehold is owned by Heineken UK.

== Architecture ==
=== Exterior ===
The building is constructed in brick, with the front finished in lined‑out stucco, and has a Welsh slate roof with an end chimney. It has a double‑depth layout with a single room to the width, and a corridor on the right giving access to two public rooms. The front has one bay and three storeys above a cellar, with a doorway on the left, a single sash window on the right, and late 20th‑century railings around the cellar entrance. The first floor has a two‑pane sash window, and the second floor has a three‑pane casement window, each section divided into three smaller panes.

=== Interior ===
Inside, a corridor on the left leads to two small public rooms on the right, arranged one behind the other. These rooms are divided from the corridor by a boarded partition, with the rear section incorporating a glazed upper panel. Both rooms retain fixed bench seating, and the doorways are flanked by baffle screens. Each room has a later 20th‑century replacement fireplace. The servery is set under the stairs in the corridor and is only large enough for one person; its glazed superstructure dates from around 1930. The rear room keeps additional historic features, including bell pushes around the seating and an etched window, although some elements such as the original fireplace and certain glazed panels have been replaced or removed. The gents' toilet retains a 1930s glass panel on the door, while the former ladies' facility outside has been covered over.

== See also ==
- Listed buildings in Manchester-M1
- Listed pubs in Greater Manchester
