= Herne, Kent =

Village in South East England

Coordinates: 51.3492°N 1.1331°E

Herne
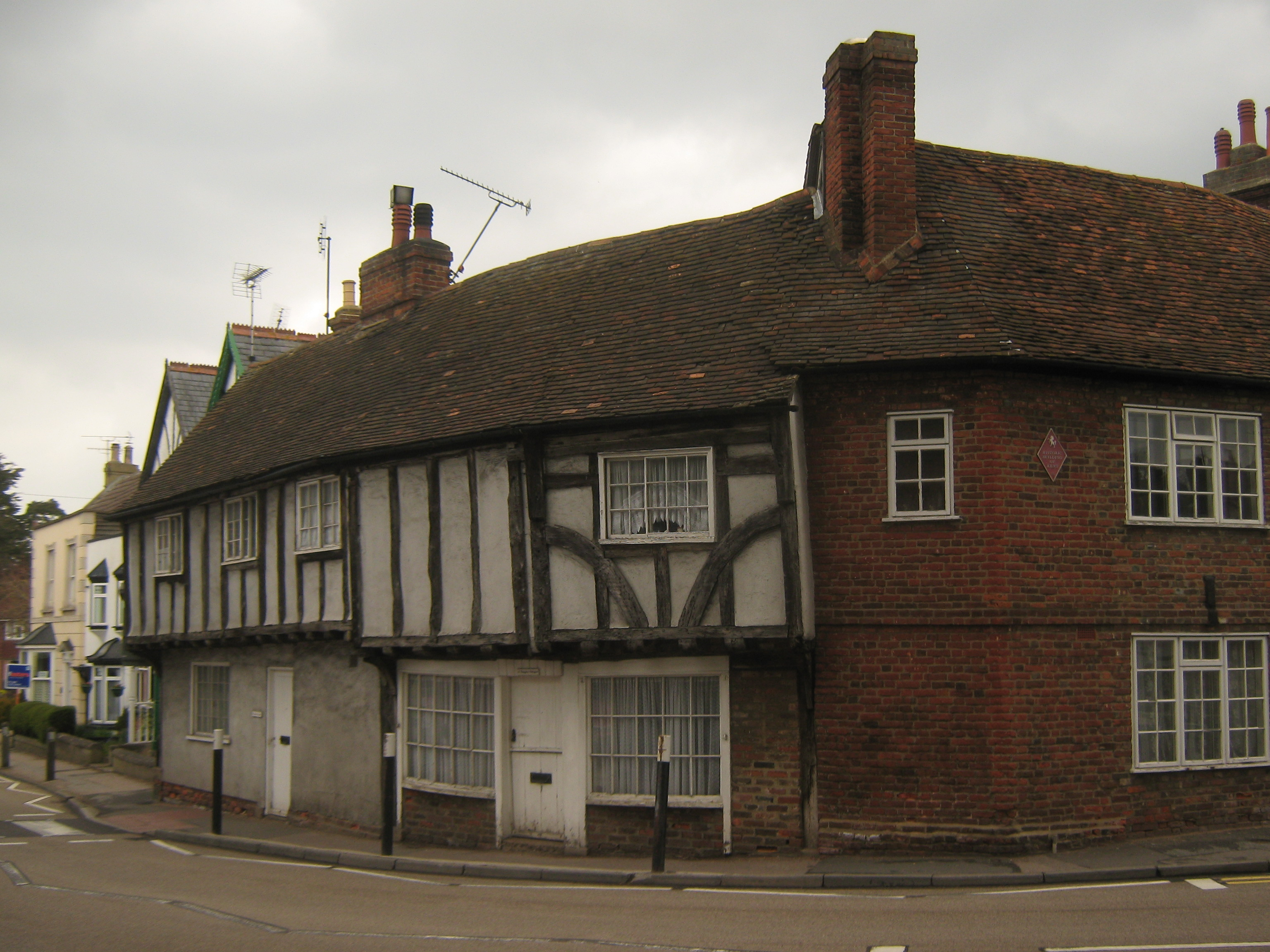
- Smugglers Cottages

- Location within Kent
- Population: 7,325 (2001) (parish)
- OS grid reference: TR181658
- Civil parish: Herne and Broomfield
- District: City of Canterbury
- Shire county: Kent
- Region: South East
- Country: England
- Sovereign state: United Kingdom
- Post town: HERNE BAY
- Postcode district: CT6
- Dialling code: 01227
- Police: Kent
- Fire: Kent
- Ambulance: South East Coast
- UK Parliament: Herne Bay and Sandwich

Herne /hɜːrn/ is a village in the civil parish of Herne and Broomfield, in Canterbury district, in the county of Kent, England. It is divided by the Thanet Way from the seaside resort of Herne Bay. Between Herne and Broomfield, is the former hamlet of Hunters Forstal. Herne Common lies to the south on the A291 road.

== Etymology ==
The word Herne, or Hearne, is derived from the Saxon word Hyrne or Hurne, signifying a nook or corner. It has been suggested that the name might originate from the grey heron, a native bird in kent spotted in the village. According to the Visitor's Guide to Herne Bay, the theory lacks evidence. Nevertheless, the grey heron does appear on the crest of the Knowler family of Herne, and on the badge of Herne Bay Urban District Council.

== History ==
Herne was developed as the first landfall along the coast from Reculver, and its old medieval street pattern is still visible today. In 1310, St Martin's Church became a parish church and was granted the privilege of a weekly market by Edward II in 1313. Historically, Herne acted as a control for the flow of goods between Kent's north coast and Canterbury. A petition was sent to Edward III around 1338 from Herne and Canterbury, requesting a pardon in relation to a suspected plot to kill John de Strode in Herne. The petition argued that the accusation was false, as Strode was still alive.

Herne was in the Hundred of Blengate, which was held in the possession the Abbot of St Augustine in Canterbury until it was surrendered to the Crown in 1538. In 1591, a special legislative session was held by Roger Manwood in Canterbury for a review of the convictions of a group of men rioting in Herne. Letters sent from the Privy Council to the Bishop of Dover ordered the punishment of rioters, who caused fights by stopping corn wagons. The 1590s had seen a very poor harvest of both corn and wheat.

The village grew only slowly until the 18th century, when wealthy families from Canterbury started visiting to take advantage of the village's close proximity to the sea. Due to poverty, the village of Herne received charity relief in 1835. On 1 April 1934, the parish was abolished and merged with Herne Bay.

== Amenities ==
Herne has infant and junior schools, and a post office. The Butchers Arms micropub opened in Herne, in 2005.

== Notable buildings ==
=== St Martin’s Church ===
St Martin's Church is a grade I listed building in Herne. There was once a 12th- to 13th-century chapel to the east of the present building. 1976 archaeological excavations inside the church indicated that the first church was similar to the earliest Anglo-Saxon ones found in Kent. The historian Nicholas Brooks noted that the Domesday Monachorum lists Herne as the location of a minster. Brooks speculated that this referred to the church excavated, and that it may have been founded in the 7th or 8th century, but perhaps as late as the 11th century.

Perhaps most likely that the foundation of a [minster] at Herne should be attributed to the tenth century when attempts were being made to recover from the devastation of the Viking incursions.

During 1296, the church was in the vicarage of the archbishop's manor. A building campaign began in 1301; a west tower on the north aisle and a new north aisle and arcade were built.

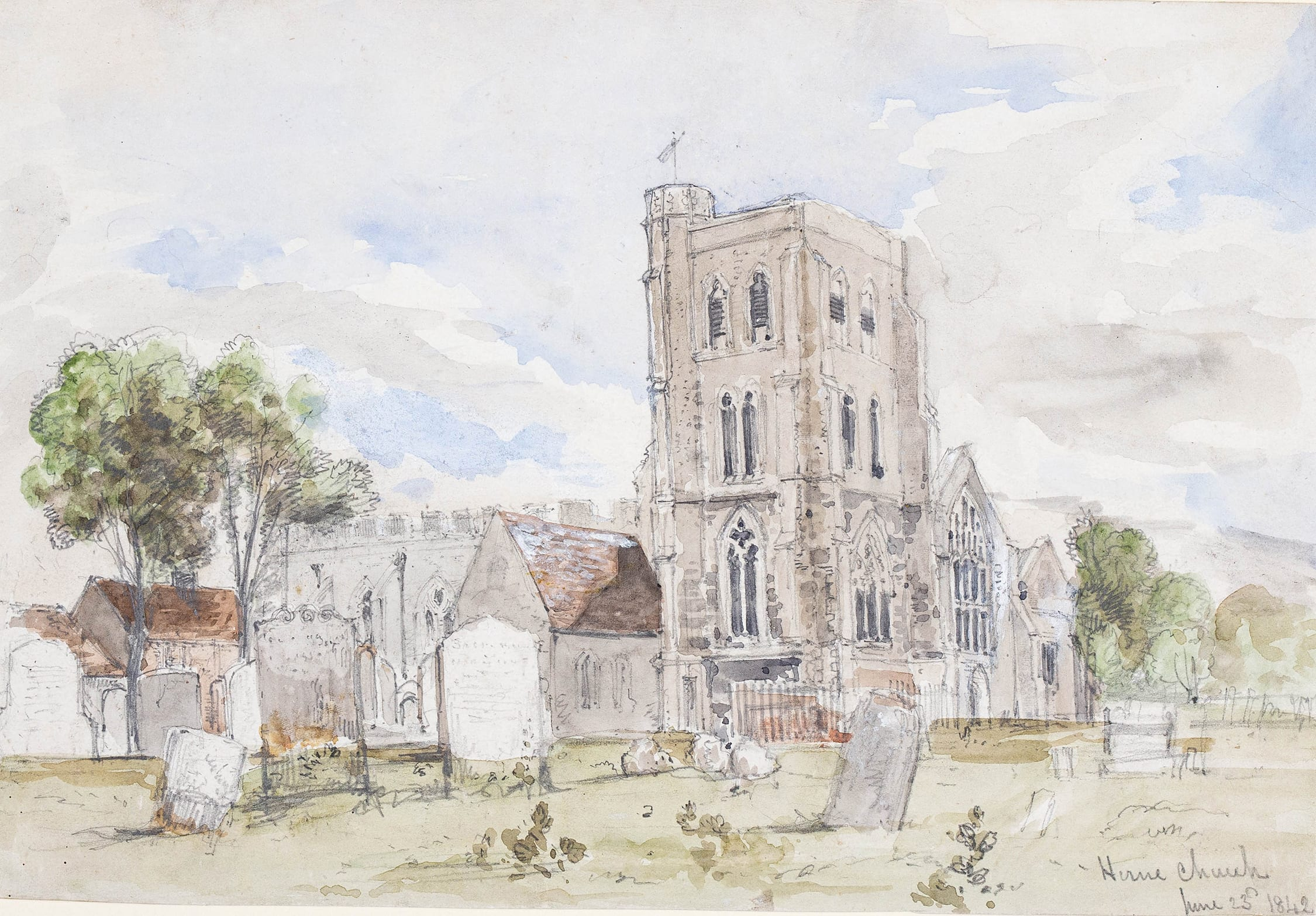
Inscribed and dated, 23rd June 1842. Provenance: Album of Ebenezer Landells studies.

In 1310, the church became a parish church. Stone blocks from the earlier chapel were reused for St Martin's Church. The earlier 14th-century church windows are low in comparison to the later ones of the same century, and they feature Gothic elements such as intersecting tracery, and foiled circles at the window arches. The earliest such monument is Peter Halle, a knight who died in 1430; he is shown holding hands with Lady Elizabeth Waleys.

Nicholas Ridley was appointed vicar of Herne in 1538 by Archbishop Thomas Cranmer, and collaborated on the Forty-two articles of Religion. Ridley held the position until 1550 when he ordered the choir to sing the Te Deum in English rather than Latin. In response to his preference for the liturgy of the Protestant Church he was burned at the stake by the order of Queen Mary. During the 19th century the church was extensively restored by the architect Francis Butler.

=== Hawe Manor ===
In the 15th century, Matthew Phillip, who rose to be appointed warden of the goldsmiths' guild and Lord Mayor of London, owned Hawe Manor. Later the manor, a little under half a mile (733 m) north-east of Herne, was the home of John Fineux, Lord Chief Justice of the King's Bench from 1495 to 1526.

== In popular culture ==
Author Russell Hoban repurposes Bullockstone as "Bollock Stoanes" in his 1980, post-apocalyptic novel, Riddley Walker.

== Local culture ==
In 1835 a folk legend told by locals relating to Herne and Hunter’s Forstal is recorded.

A legend is repeated to strangers at Herne, that, many years ago, a rich squire of the neighbourhood went a-coursing on the Sabbath day, and was torn to pieces by his own greyhounds. The place where this happened, is called Hunter's Forstal, a mile or two from Herne.

== Notable people ==
- Dudley Pout
- Glyn Watts

== Bibliography ==
- Brooks, Nicholas (1984), "The earliest church at Herne", in McIntosh, K.H.; Gough, H.E. (eds.), Hoath and Herne: The Last of the Forest, K. H. McIntosh, p. 14, ISBN 978-0-95024-237-8
- Bundock, Mike (2007), Historic Herne and Broomfield, Pierhead, ISBN 9781904661047
- Campbell, J. (1849), The Lives of the Chief Justices of England, from the Norman Conquest till the Death of Lord Mansfield, John Murray, hdl:2027/njp.32101062172679, OCLC 3462346
- Duncombe, J. (1784), "The history and antiquities of the two parishes of Reculver and Herne, in the county of Kent", in Nichols, J. (ed.), Bibliotheca Topographica Britannica, vol. 18, Nichols, pp. 65–161, OCLC 475730544
- Gough, H. (1992), "Eadred's charter of AD 949 and the extent of the monastic estate at Reculver, Kent", in Ramsay, N.; Sparks, M.; Tatton-Brown, T. (eds.), St Dunstan: His Life, Times and Cult, Boydell, pp. 89–102, ISBN 978-0-85115-301-8
- Gough, H. (2001), "The Archbishop's manor at Ford, Hoath" (PDF), Archaeologia Cantiana, 121: 251–68, ISSN 0066-5894, archived (PDF) from the original on 13 September 2015
- Noorthouck, J. (1773), "Addenda: The mayors and sheriffs of London", A New History of London including Westminster and Southwark, Baldwin, pp. 889–93, OCLC 938170595, archived from the original on 11 November 2016
- Philp, B.; Gough, H. (1976), "Early church discovered at Herne", Kent Archaeological Review (44): 86–91
- Sparks, M. (1984a), "Church life in medieval Herne", in McIntosh, K.H.; Gough, H.E. (eds.), Hoath and Herne: The Last of the Forest, K. H. McIntosh, pp. 24–9, ISBN 978-0-95024-237-8
- Sparks, M. (1984b), "Sir John Fyneux: A Herne worthy", in McIntosh, K.H.; Gough, H.E. (eds.), Hoath and Herne: The Last of the Forest, K. H. McIntosh, pp. 24–9, ISBN 978-0-95024-237-8
