= James Watts (British politician) =

Former British Conservative politician

James Watts MP
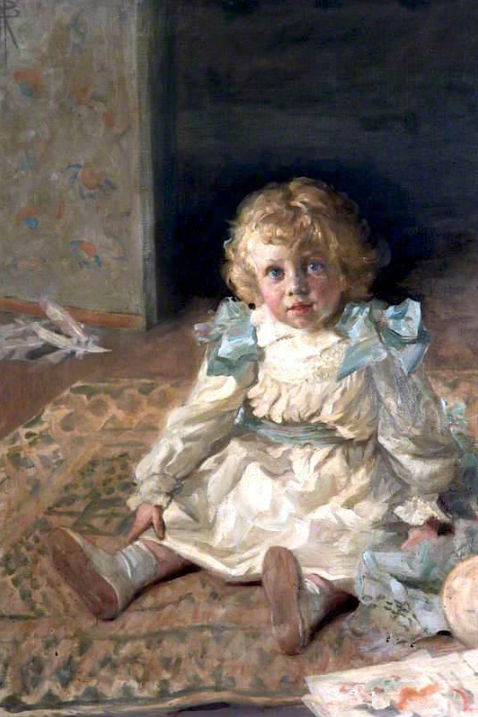

Member of Parliament for Manchester Moss Side
- In office 7 October 1959 – 7 July 1961
- Prime Minister: Harold Macmillan
- Preceded by: Florence Horsbrugh
- Succeeded by: Frank Taylor

Personal details
- Born: 22 August 1903 Cheadle, Cheshire, England
- Died: 7 July 1961 (aged 57) Belgravia, London, England
- Resting place: South Ealing Cemetery
- Party: Conservative
- Relatives: James Watts (great-grandfather); Agatha Christie (aunt); Rosalind Hicks (cousin); Felicity Peake (cousin)
- Occupation: Politician

James Watts (22 August 1903 – 7 July 1961) was a Conservative politician in the United Kingdom.

He was elected at the 1959 general election as Member of Parliament for Manchester Moss Side, but died in office two years later, aged 57. His aunt was Dame Agatha Christie, who dedicated several books to him, including The Secret of Chimneys (1925).

== Early life ==
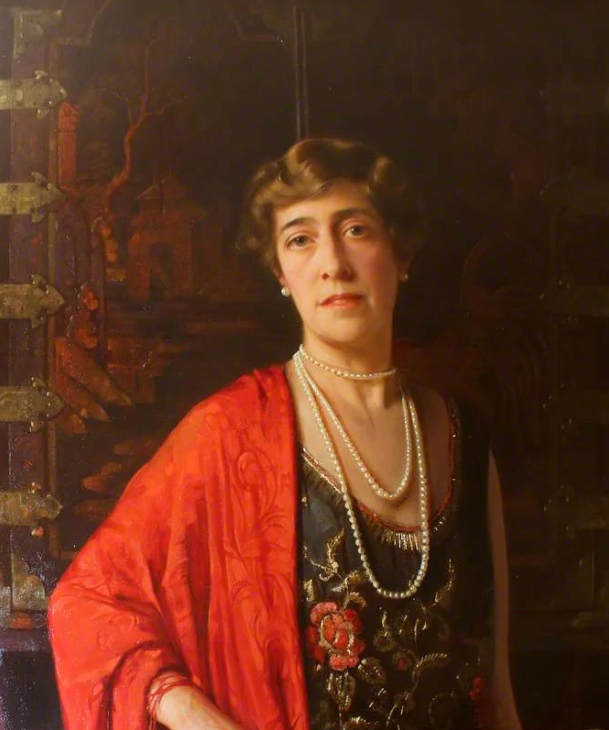
Margaret Watts

James "Jack" Watts was the only child of James "Jim" Watts and Margaret Watts. He was born at his parents' home, Manor Lodge, close to his paternal grandparents' estate of Abney Hall, Cheadle. He was christened in Torquay that autumn, during the first of many visits to his maternal grandmother, Clarissa Miller. Watts family moved to Cheadle Hall in 1915, and to Abney Hall in 1926.

Jack was educated at Shrewsbury School, then entered New College, Oxford University. He earned a bachelor's degree, and was awarded his MA in November 1928. By then, he had joined his father at the family firm, S. & J. Watts Ltd. of Manchester.

The 1939 Register shows him residing with his parents at Abney; still working in the family business, he is also listed as a captain in the 6th Battalion/22nd Cheshire Regiment. During World War II, he served in France and the Middle East.

== Biography ==
Although baptized into the Church of England, Watts converted to Roman Catholicism in the 1920s.

In April 1930, newspapers announced his engagement to Lady Rosemary Wilma Bootle-Wilbraham, daughter of the 2nd Earl of Lathom; the ceremony was scheduled for June in Westminster Cathedral, and Watts' cousin Rosalind Hicks was to be among the child attendants. Less than three weeks before the wedding, however, the engagement was broken off, and later that summer Lady Rosemary married another man. Watts never married.

Watts' mother died from heart disease in a Manchester hospital in 1950. Following a memorial service in St. Mary's parish church, Cheadle, she was privately cremated; in November, her remains were interred in the grave of her godmother Margaret Miller. Watts' father died from heart trouble and infection of the bronchi in Cheadle hospital; his ashes were interred with those of his wife on 17 July 1957. His father's estate was valued at £136,628.

Following his father's death, Watts sold Abney Hall to the Cheadle and Gatley District Town Council for about £12,000. There was a ten-day auction of 2,850 lots (including 300 paintings) to clear Abney's approximately 40 rooms. Watts' permanent residence was a five-storey terrace house in Chester Street, Belgravia, London, which he held on a long-term lease.

== Career ==
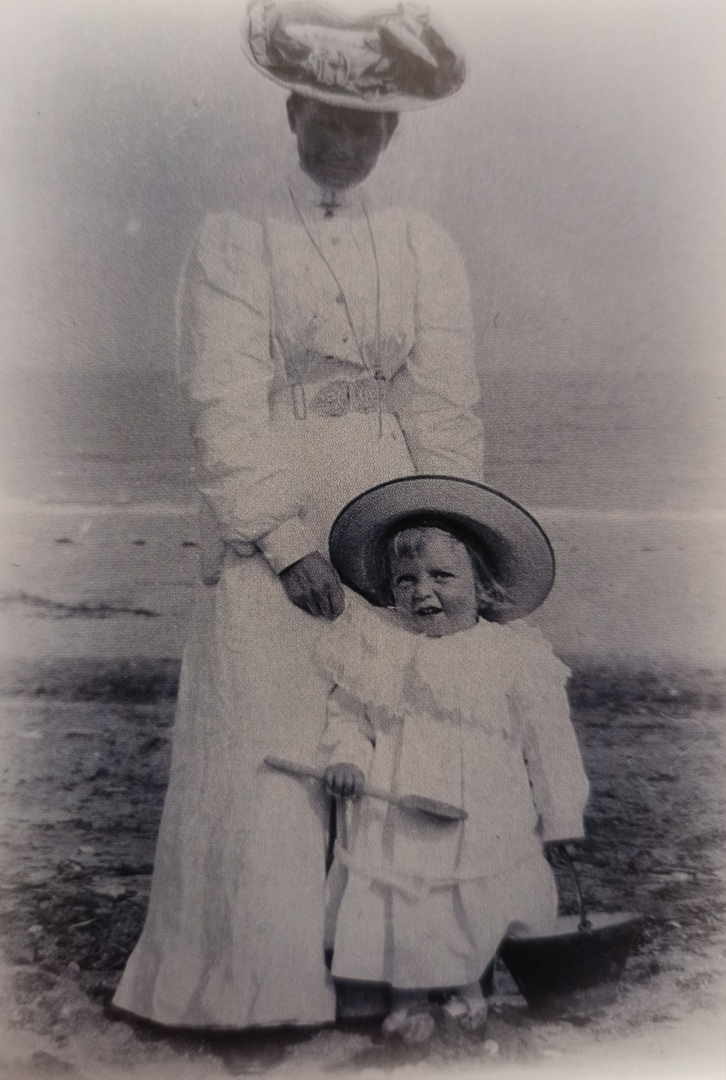
James Watts as a child with his German governess

Watts served on the Manchester City Council 1933 to 1939. From 1933 to 1951, he was treasurer of the Manchester Conservative Association, and from 1951 to 1953, its chairman. In 1950, he stood for Parliament as a Conservative for Manchester-Gorton but was defeated. He stood again in the General Election of 1959, and this time was successful. He seems to have made few speeches in the House, but is known to have favoured corporal punishment, slum clearance, building additional housing for the working classes, and limiting immigration. He died in office aged 57 in 1961. His successor in the subsequent by-election was Frank Taylor.

== Death ==
In June 1961, James Watts broke his ankle on the dance floor. He was recovering, but died unexpectedly of a pulmonary embolism on 7 July. According to his butler, he was in good form at first the morning, but he collapsed at noon, and was dead in a few minutes.

There were memorial services for him in both Manchester and London. His cremated remains were interred here with those of his parents in South Ealing Cemetery on 13 July 1961. His estate was valued at £183,955 most of which was inherited by his cousin Rosalind's son, Mathew Prichard. His home in London was bequeathed to his aunt Agatha Christie.

Parliament of the United Kingdom
Preceded by Florence Horsbrugh	Member of Parliament for Manchester Moss Side; 1959–1961	Succeeded by Frank Taylor
