= Portland Street, Manchester =

Street in Manchester, United Kingdom

Coordinates: 53°28′39″N 2°14′26″W

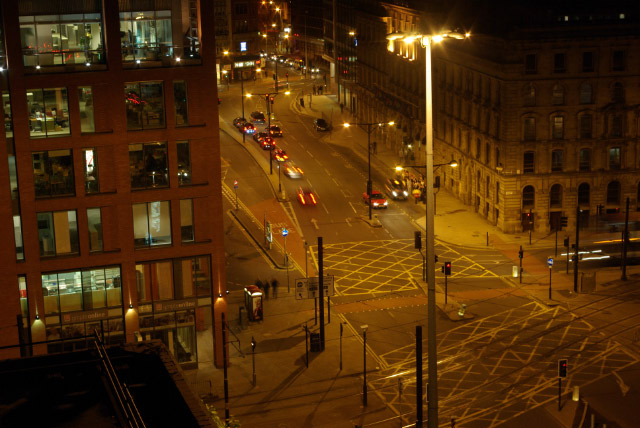
Aerial view of Portland Street at night

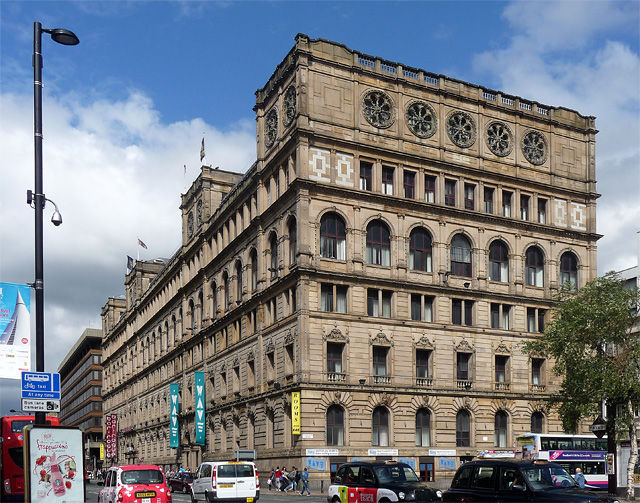
Britannia House, one of Manchester's most imposing buildings

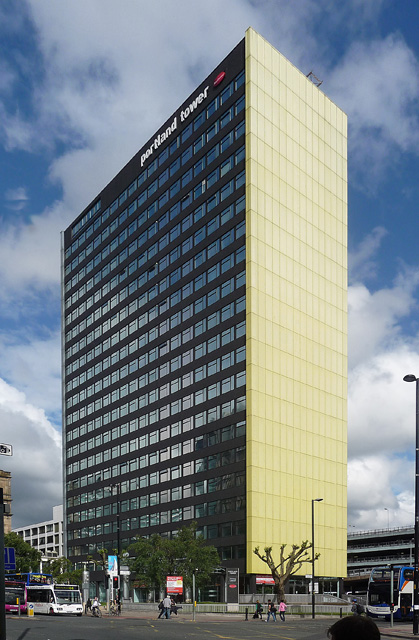
Manchester One (formerly Portland Tower) is among the city's tallest buildings

Portland Street is a street in Manchester, England, which runs from Piccadilly at its junction with Newton Street south-westwards to Oxford Street at its junction with Chepstow Street. The major buildings of Portland Street include the largest former warehouse in the city centre, Watts Warehouse (grade II* listed), the former Bank of England building and other former warehouses on the corners of Princess Street.

== Location ==
Portland Street was a name given to a new street on the site of a lane called Garrett Lane after a 14th-century hall, Garrett Hall; like some others, it was borrowed from the street of the same name in London by wealthy Manchester men in the early 19th century. It became Victorian Manchester's showpiece: until the 1850s, it ended at David Street (afterwards renamed Princess Street). From the 1840s, this part of the town began to be taken over by warehouses and during the 1850s and 1860s they predominated in Portland Street.

The 1911 Victoria County History refers to "a very fine vista of unbroken line" of warehouse buildings "chiefly constructed in brick and terra cotta". Its parade of impressive buildings was reduced by bombing during the Manchester Blitz of the Second World War and some later development ignored the old building line.

== Buildings ==
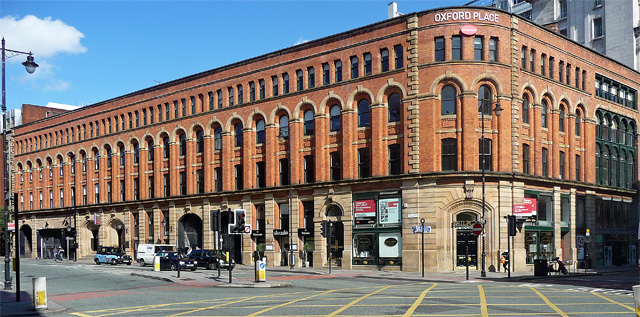
The Behrens Building on the Oxford Street corner

One building is grade II* listed (Watts Warehouse) and many are grade II listed, including the former Pickles Building at no. 101, the Portland Thistle Hotel at 3, 5 and 9, Nos. 74–80 (including the Grey Horse public house) and many old Victorian textile warehouses.

- Watts Warehouse (1851), now Britannia House, at Nos. 35–47 between Minshull Street and Chorlton Street. The architects were Travis & Mangnall and each floor is built in a different architectural style, none of which are Gothic or Classical but "a licentious bit of confectionery in stone, iron, timber and glass". At the top are four roof pavilions with wheel windows. It was converted to a variety of new uses in the mid-1970s.
- St Andrew's House (1962), between Chorlton Street and Sackville Street, architects Leach, Rhodes & Walker, and Telephone House (1961), between Sackville Street and Abingdon Street, are tall slabs set back from the original building line. St Andrew's House was built by a technique which was new at the time: the core of the 21-storey building was cast continuously using a climbing shutter and the precast external panels fixed using a tower crane thus dispensing with scaffolding. Thus tenants were installed on the lowest floors before the upper seven storeys had been built.
- Bank of England building (1971), between York Street and Charlotte Street, architects Fitzroy Robinson & Partners, consists of a solid podium topped by two contrasting blocks. Having been vacated by the bank it has been converted to other uses.
- Pickles Building (1870) on the east side, at no. 101 on Princess Street corner, is a former warehouse; the architects were Clegg & Knowles.
- Westminster House (1970s), was built as the County Hall (head office) for Greater Manchester County Council, an administrative body covering the region from 1974 to 1986.
- The Circus Tavern claims to have the smallest bar in Europe. It is a Grade II listed building.

== Transport ==
The northernmost section of Portland Street is close to the bus and Metrolink stations at Piccadilly Gardens and the Metrolink line towards Piccadilly railway station crosses Portland Street to get into Aytoun Street. There are bus stops for southbound services near Sackville Street and northbound services near Dickinson Street. Chorlton Street coach station is nearby south of Chorlton Street next to the gay village.

== See also ==
- List of streets and roads in Manchester
