= 1st Manchester Rifles =

6th (1st Manchester Rifles) Lancashire RVC 2nd Volunteer Bn, Manchester Regiment 6th Bn, Manchester Regiment 65th (Manchester Regiment) HAA Regiment 465 (Manchester) HAA Regiment
- Active: 25 August 1859 – 10 March 1955
- Country: United Kingdom
- Branch: Territorial Army
- Role: Infantry; Air defence
- Size: 1-3 Infantry battalions Artillery regiment
- Part of: 127th (Manchester) Brigade; Anti-Aircraft Command; British Army in Ceylon; Middle East Command
- Garrison/HQ: Hulme
- Engagements: First World War: Third Battle of Krithia; Battle of Krithia Vineyard; Battle of Romani; Battle of Poelcapelle; Defence of Bucquoy; Battle of Albert; Battle of the Canal du Nord; Battle of the Selle; Second World War: Battle of Britain; Defence of Ceylon

The 1st Manchester Rifles, later the 6th Battalion, Manchester Regiment, was a unit of Britain's Volunteer Force and Territorial Army recruited in and around Manchester. It served as infantry at Gallipoli, fighting with distinction at the Third Battle of Krithia, and in some of the bitterest battles on the Western Front in the First World War. After conversion into an anti-aircraft unit of the Royal Artillery between the wars, it defended Manchester, Scapa Flow and Ceylon during the Second World War and continued in the air defence role until 1955.

== Volunteer Force ==
The enthusiasm for the Volunteer movement following an invasion scare in 1859 saw the creation of many Rifle Volunteer Corps (RVCs) composed of part-time soldiers eager to supplement the Regular British Army in time of need. One such unit was the 6th Lancashire RVC raised at Manchester following a public meeting on 20 May 1859. The first 60 volunteers were sworn in on 7 June and began drilling at the Militia Barracks under staff sergeants of the 6th Lancashire Militia. The unit was formally accepted by the Lord Lieutenant of Lancashire, the Earl of Sefton, on 25 August 1859. A number of large Manchester firms such as J.P. & E. Westhead (3rd Company) and J. & N. Philips (8th Company) provided whole companies from their employees, others came from the Manchester Cotton Exchange (4th Company) and from the Athenaeum Gymnastic Club (5th (1st Athenaeum) Company under Captain William Romaine Callender). Volunteers from the townships of Hulme, Moss Side, Cornbrook and Stretford, including groups from the Commercial Mills at Hulme and from T.G. Hill & Co, formed a 7th (Old Trafford) Company. The 6th Lancashire RVC soon had a strength of 12 companies. Viscount Grey de Wilton was appointed Lieutenant-Colonel Commandant on 19 February 1860 and by the following month the unit had adopted the additional title of 1st Manchester Rifles. The 2nd and 3rd Manchester Rifles and the Ardwick Artizan Rifles (numbered as the 28th, 40th and 33rd Lancashire RVCs respectively) also appeared at this time, making up an unofficial Manchester Brigade at the Volunteer reviews.

The 1st Manchester Rifle Volunteers opened its headquarters (HQ) in Hopwood Avenue and its members drilled in various warehouses, in Carpenter's Hall, the Bazaar in Bridge Street, at Salford Dyeworks, and at the Cavalry Barracks in Hulme. The Old Trafford company paraded at Pomona Gardens and later at the Infantry Barracks at Salford, where they drilled under Regular Army staff sergeants of the 96th Regiment. The majority of volunteers enrolled in the unit were warehousemen and clerks. The uniform was scarlet with yellow facings.

In October 1860, No 12 Company, based at Eccles, transferred to the 46th Lancashire RVC at Swinton but the following year the 6th absorbed the 43rd Lancashire RVC, originally raised on 11 February 1860 at Fallowfield. In March 1865 the 1st Manchesters moved their HQ to an office at 1 Brown Street, and then in July the following year to Wolstenholme's Court, Market Street, Manchester, where it stayed for a number of years. Drills were carried out at Barker's Riding School in Greenheys. From the 1880s the HQ and drill hall was at 3 Stretford Road, Hulme.

Under the 'Localisation of the Forces' introduced by the Cardwell Reforms, the 6th was linked with other Manchester-based RVCs, Militia regiments and the Regular 63rd and 96th Foot into Brigade No 16 (Lancashire). When the 63rd and 96th were amalgamated to create the Manchester Regiment in 1881 as part of the Childers Reforms, the 6th Lancashire RVC was formally attached to it as a Volunteer Battalion on 1 July, and changed its designation to 2nd Volunteer Battalion, Manchester Regiment on 1 September 1887. Under the mobilisation plan introduced by the Stanhope Memorandum in 1891, the five (later six) Volunteer Battalions of the regiment constituted the Manchester Brigade.

Between 1887 and 1908 the 2nd VB maintained a Mounted infantry company. Volunteers from the battalion served in a Service Company alongside the Regulars of the regiment during the Second Boer War, gaining the battalion its first Battle Honour South Africa 1900–1902. According to their memorial, 157 men of the 2nd VB served during the war, of whom six died on active service.

== Territorial Force ==
When the Volunteers were subsumed into the new Territorial Force (TF) under the Haldane Reforms of 1908, the 2nd Volunteer Battalion became the 6th Battalion, Manchester Regiment, except 'N' Company at Manchester University, which became part of the Officers' Training Corps and was the forerunner of today's Manchester & Salford University OTC. The Manchester Brigade became part of the East Lancashire Division of the TF.

== First World War ==
=== Mobilisation ===
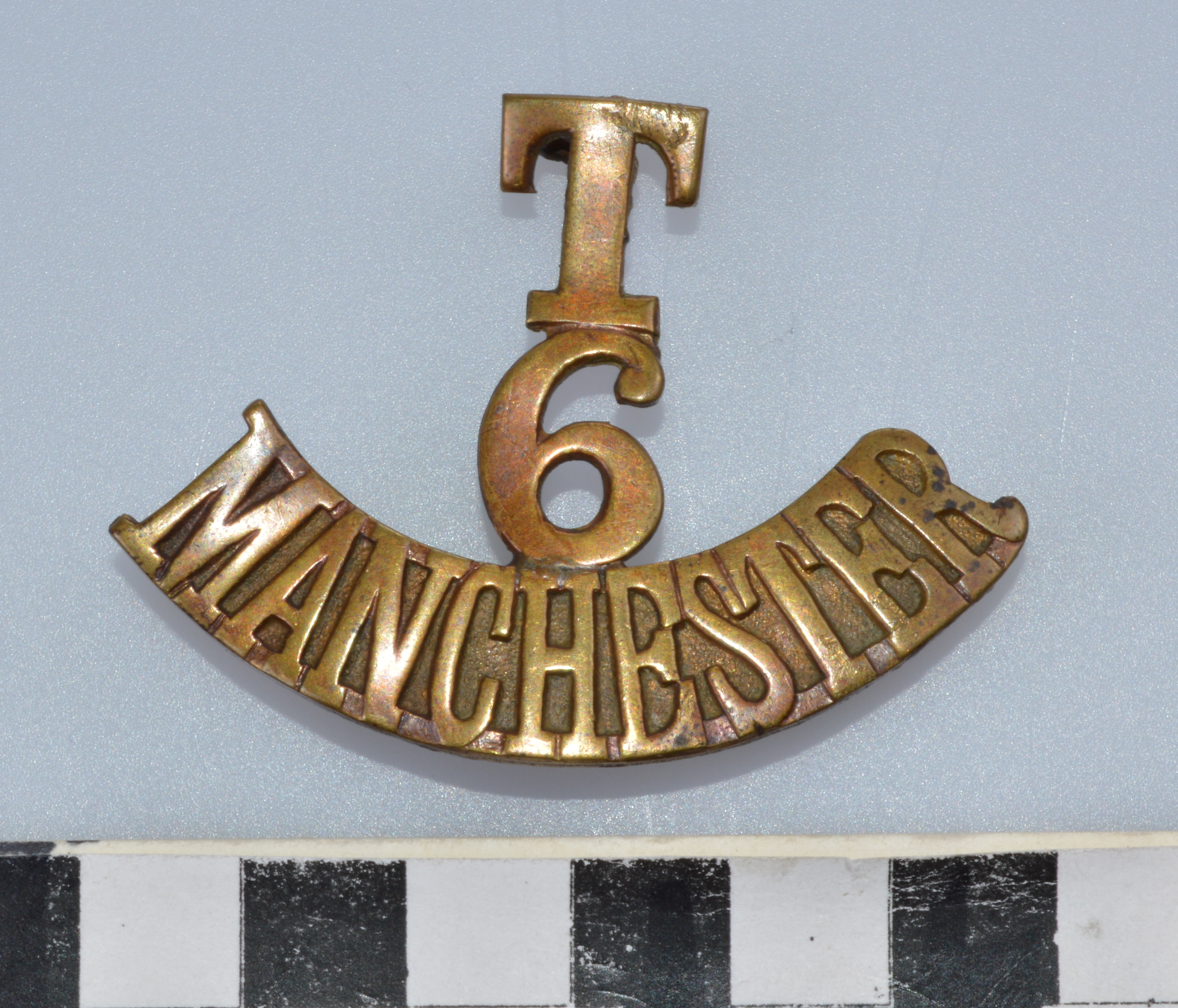
Brass shoulder title of 6th Bn Manchester Regiment (TF), First World War

On the outbreak of war, the division was at its annual camp when the order to mobilise was received at 05.30 on 4 August. The units returned to their drill halls to mobilise, the men being billeted close by. On 20 August, having volunteered for overseas service, the division moved into camps for training, and on 9 September it entrained for Southampton to embark for Egypt. 6th Manchesters were under Lt-Col G.G.P. Heywood, who had been commanding officer (CO) since 1 September 1911.

On 31 August 1914, the formation of Reserve or 2nd Line units for each existing TF unit was authorised. Initially these were formed from men who had not volunteered for overseas service, and the recruits who were flooding in. Later they were mobilised for overseas service in their own right. From now on, the original battalion was designated the 1/6th Manchesters, and the 2nd Line was the 2/6th; later a 3rd line battalion was formed.

=== 1/6th Battalion ===
The East Lancashire Division began to disembark at Alexandria on 25 September and the 6th Manchesters went into garrison at Mustapha Barracks in that city. At first the division's role was simply to relieve Regular troops from the garrison for service on the Western Front, but on 5 November Britain declared war on Turkey and Egypt became a war zone. While the East Lancashire Division went to guard the Suez Canal, the Manchester Bde was detached to garrison Cairo.

==== Gallipoli ====
On 3 May 1915 the battalion (under the command of Major C.R. Pilkington, Lt-Col Heywood being unfit) embarked at Alexandria on the SS Derfflinger, a captured German Norddeutscher Lloyd shipping line vessel that had just arrived with a cargo of wounded from the initial landings at Gallipoli. Derfflinger missed her intended landing spot at Cape Helles, and so the Manchesters arrived late on 6 May, after the rest of the division had gone into action. The 1/6th Bn bivouacked above 'W' Beach ('Lancashire Landing') and during the night of 7/8 May was moved, with ammunition, rations and entrenching equipment, but no blankets or baggage, to the Krithia sector, where the men went into the firing line for a 10-day period. On 12 May the brigade made a feint attack to attract attention away from a movement elsewhere

On 25 May, the East Lancashire Division was formally designated 42nd (East Lancashire) Division, and the Manchester Brigade became 127th (Manchester) Brigade.

During another spell in front of Krithia beginning on 25 May, the 1/6th and 1/5th Manchesters advanced their line between 50 and 200 yards (180 m). The lines were now within assaulting distance of the nearest Turkish trenches, and a new attack (the Third Battle of Krithia) was launched on 4 June. After a bombardment starting at 08.00, the assault was launched at noon. The Manchester Brigade led 42nd Division's attack, with half of 1/6th Bn on the left, and in this sector all went well to begin with: despite intense rifle and machine gun fire the brigade took all its first objectives, the second wave passing through and parties advancing up to 1,000 yards (910 m) into the Turkish fourth line. The Official History records that 'The Manchester Territorials, fighting like veterans, were all in high fettle'. There was almost nothing between them and Krithia, and beyond that the ultimate target of Achi Baba. However, things had gone disastrously wrong for 127 Bde's neighbours, and the Turks were counter-attacking both flanks. C Company of 1/6th Bn, which had advanced furthest, was cut off and practically wiped out. Although the Manchesters held on to the first Turkish line they had captured, casualties had been severe, and only 160 out of 770 men of 1/6th Bn answered evening roll-call. The Manchesters consolidated their position on 5 June before being relieved that night and going into reserve.

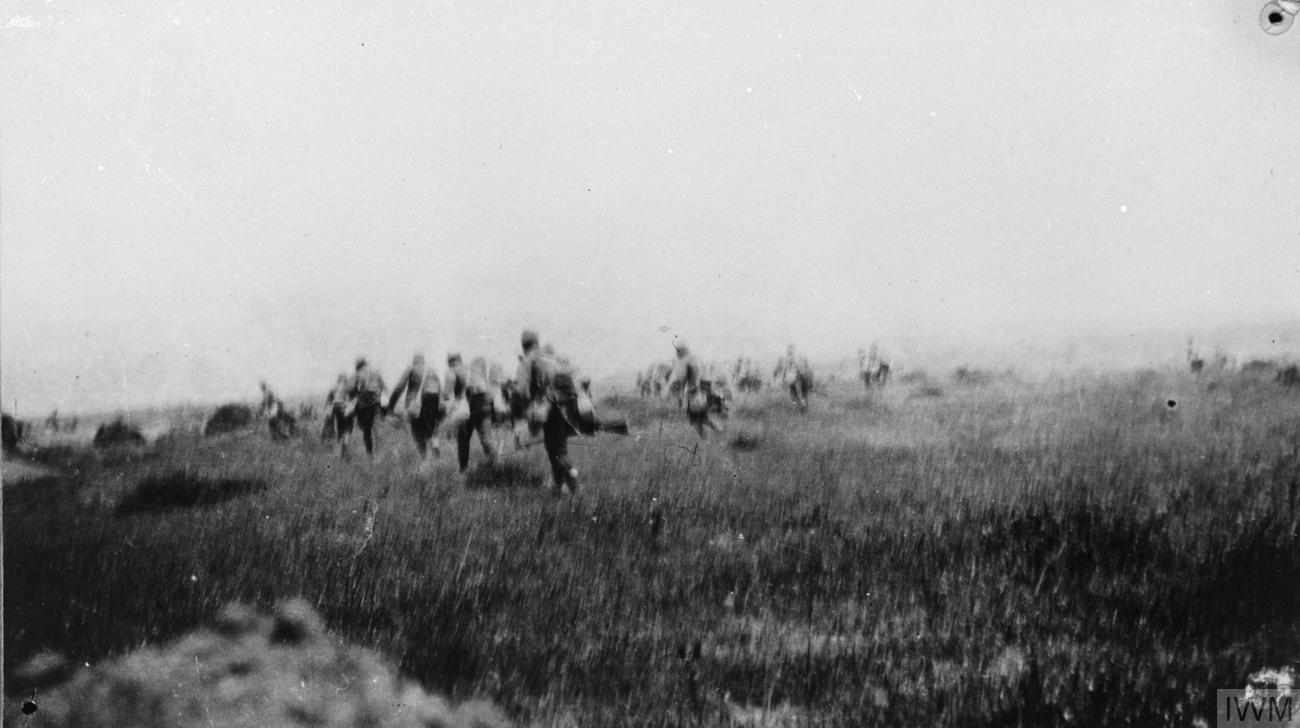
Tommies of the 1/6th Battalion, Manchester Regiment advancing over open terrain during the Third Battle of Krithia, June 1915.

On 12 June the Manchester Brigade was withdrawn from the Gallipoli Peninsula and went to the island of Imbros for rest. It returned to Cape Helles on 22 June and 1/6th Bn went up to the firing line in the Krithia Nullah sector on 24 June. They held the Turkish trench they had captured while the formations on either flank attempted to improve their positions. The sector was given trench names reminiscent of home: 'Stretford Road', 'Greenheys Lane', 'Ardwick Green', etc. The 1/6th Manchesters then spent the next six weeks alternating in the line with 1/5th and 1/8th Bns, taking casualties steadily.

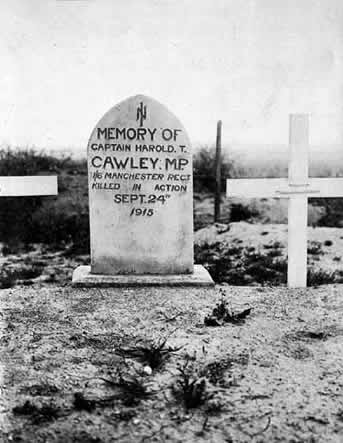
The original grave at Gallipoli of Capt Harold Cawley, MP.

A new attack at Helles (the Battle of Krithia Vineyard) began in August. 42nd Division delivered its main attack at 09.45 on 7 August, but despite the bombardment and assistance from machine guns and trench mortars, 127 Bde could make little progress. 1/6th Manchesters, described by the divisional commander as 'that fine battalion', seized a Turkish redoubt in Krithia Nullah and held it 'until they were practically annihilated'. By 19.15 that evening the Manchesters were back in their old positions. 127th Brigade was temporarily unfit for service and its total strength was only that of a single battalion, though it relieved 125th (Lancashire Fusiliers) Brigade on 8/9 August and continued the fight, with 1/6th Bn doing good work in defending a trench near Krithia Vineyard. After a short rest and receiving a few drafts and returning casualties, the division was put back into the line on 19 August, still badly under strength and suffering from sickness. The 1/5th and 1/6th Manchesters were temporarily combined under the command of Lt-Col Pilkington.

During September the Turks exploded a series of mines in front of the British trench known as the 'Gridiron' and damaging its defences. Repairs after one mine on 22 September were covered by a bombing party of 1/6th Manchesters who held the lip of the crater. The same day the Royal Engineers exploded a counter-mine and the Manchesters rushed the crater and built a barrier across it. Captain Harold Cawley of 1/6th Bn, the Member of parliament for Heywood, was killed that night by a Turkish sniper, and the crater became known as 'Cawley's Crater'. The division continued to hold its position, suffering casualties from mining and bad weather, until its infantry were evacuated to Mudros on 29 December.

==== Romani ====
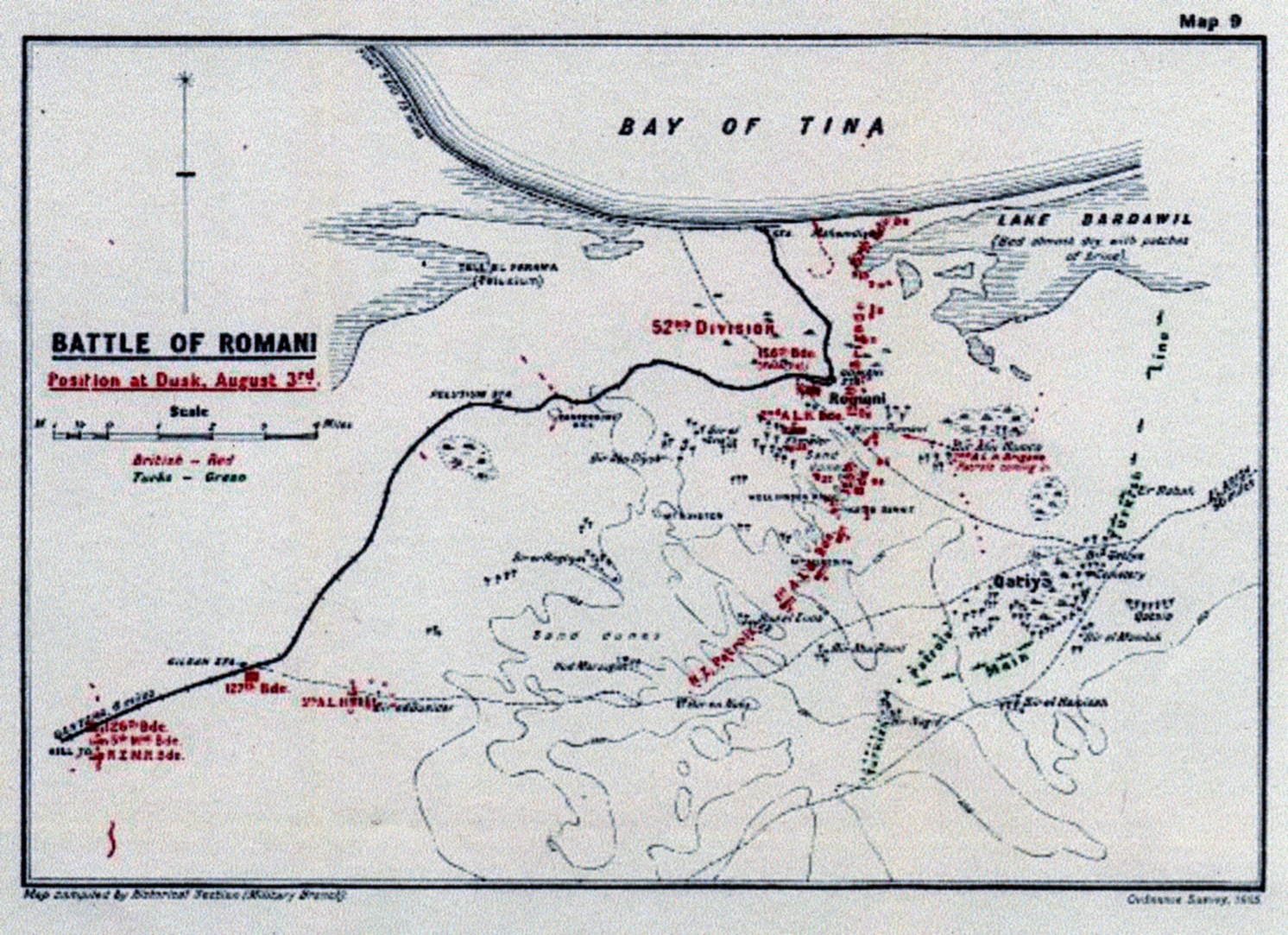
The Battle of Romani 3–4 August 1916.

The Gallipoli Campaign was shut down at the beginning of January, but 42nd Division remained on Mudros until the middle of the month before returning to the Egyptian Expeditionary Force (EEF) and the Suez Canal defences. From February to 1916 it was stationed at Shallufa, base for the Southern Sector of the defences, broken by spells of training in the desert. In June the division was moved to the Central Sector, between Ismailia and Qantara. In July, 42nd Division became part of a Mobile Column (under Maj-Gen Hon Herbert Lawrence, former brigadier of 127 Bde) formed to counter a threatened Turkish thrust across the Sinai desert before it reached the canal. 127 Brigade was the advanced brigade of this force, and on 3 August 1/6th Manchesters moved to Pelusium, six miles north-west of Romani to prepare defences to cover the railhead for the arrival of the rest of the brigade. The Battle of Romani opened early on the morning of 4 August, and the rest of 127 Bde was rushed up, passing through 1/6th Manchesters to support the Anzac Mounted Division, which was heavily engaged. That night the 1/6th Manchesters escorted the camel transport carrying vital water and supplies up to the front line troops, and then rejoined 127 Bde. During 5 and 6 August the brigade pursued the defeated Turkish force, suffering badly from extreme heat and lack of water, with many men falling out through exhaustion, until it reached Qatiya.

During the Autumn the railway and water pipeline were pushed forward, and 42nd Division participated in the EEF's Advance to Wadi el Arish, which began in late November 1916 and completed the Sinai Campaign in January 1917.

==== Western Front ====
42nd Division was now ordered to join the British Expeditionary Force (BEF) on the Western Front. In early February 1917 it returned to Egypt and by 2 March the last troopship had left for France. The troops were concentrated at Pont-Remy, near Abbeville, and re-equipped; the Short Magazine Lee-Enfield rifle was issued in place of the obsolescent long model with which the battalions had gone to war. The division was employed on working parties in the area abandoned by the Germans when they retired to the Hindenburg Line, and then the brigades started taking turns in the line near Havrincourt Wood. On the night of 8/9 June all four battalions of the Manchesters went into No man's land to dig a new trench 300 yards (270 m) closer to the enemy line, which was completed and occupied the following night. The battalions also carried out regular night patrols and raids.

From 9 July to 22 August the division was in reserve, with 127 Bde stationed at Achiet-le-Petit. It then moved to the Ypres Salient to join the Third Ypres Offensive, passing through the Menin Gate on the night of 1 September. On 6 September 125 (Lancashire Fusiliers) Bde made an attack, with 1/6th Manchesters attached to provide carrying parties. After the failed attack, the Manchesters carried many of the Lancashire Fusiliers' dead back for burial.

After 18 days in the Salient, the division was relieved and moved to the Nieuport Sector on the Belgian coast, where it remained under constant shellfire until November. It then moved to the La Bassée–Béthune sector where it spent the winter building concrete defences to replace the existing poor breastworks. The BEF was now suffering a manpower crisis, and in February 1918 around a quarter of its battalions were disbanded to reinforce others; the Manchesters absorbed drafts from the disbanded 1/9th and 2/10th Bns.

==== Spring Offensive ====
When the German spring offensive opened on 21 March 1918, 42nd Division was in reserve, and on 23 March it was sent south in motor buses to reinforce Third Army. 127 Brigade debussed at midnight on the Ayette–Douchy road and set up an outpost line. The following day the division was ordered to relieve 40th Division, and 127 Bde advanced in artillery formation across open ground to take up its positions. At dawn on 25 March the Germans attacked, making some penetrations but being stopped by the Manchesters. On reports that another attack was assembling SE of Bihucourt, 1/6th Manchesters sent a company there. This arrived simultaneously with the Germans and immediately made two attacks on them, finally being forced out of the village by superior numbers. This action gave time for reinforcements to stop the enemy advancing beyond Bihucourt to Achiet-le-Grand, which the CO of 1/6th Manchesters was ordered to prevent at all costs.

By 26 March the enemy was working round the division's flanks, and it was ordered to pull back to the Bucquoy–Ablainzevelle line; 127 Brigade slipped away unnoticed. The German advance was held in front of Bucquoy, despite heavy shellfire, and on the night of 27/28 March 1/6th Manchesters sent an aggressive patrol back into Ablainzevelle, which caused casualties and disruption. The following day the battalion counter-attacked again, breaking up another German attack, and held the line all day. During one of the hottest attacks Corporal A. Brooks noticed that his men were running short of rifle oil and suffering jams, so he calmly went up and down the line with an oil can, lubricating rifle bolts while under fire. The first stage of the German offensive had been checked, although shellfire and raiding continued along the line until the division was relieved on 8 April.

When the division returned to the line front, the Third Army line was relatively quiet, the Germans having switched their offensive to the north. The policy was now to advance the line by means of small raids and aggressive patrolling (so-called 'peaceful penetration') and 1/6th Manchesters actively advanced by these means between 20 and 24 July, and in August held off determined attacks on these positions. In July the division was struck by the flu epidemic, but did receive some drafts: on 31 July the 1/6th Manchesters absorbed the remaining cadre of the 2/6th Manchesters from 66th Division (see below), and thereafter was simply referred to as the 6th Bn.

==== Hundred Days Offensive ====
The Allied counter-offensive began with the Battle of Amiens (8–12 August), as a result of which the Germans began to give ground, and 42nd Division followed up against rearguards. Third Army began its formal assault (the Battle of Albert) on 21 August. 125 Brigade advance behind a creeping barrage onto its first objective, then the barrage switched to precede 127 Brigade advancing with 6th Manchesters on the right. Assisted by morning mist, the Manchesters took their first objective, and then cleared the ravine in which the Beaucourt–Puisieux road ran, the men getting to close quarter fighting with the defenders. However, it took two attempts for the brigades to take their third objective, the Manchesters finally advancing along the ridge up to Miraumont. A counter-attack from Miraumont at 04.15 the following morning was shattered by the Manchesters, as were two more against the division that day. On 24 August the Manchesters worked round Miraumont, 6th Bn securing fords over the River Ancre, and large numbers of prisoners were taken. The division continued to advance slowly against rearguards until the end of the month. Lieutenant-Colonel T. Blatherwick, commanding 6th Manchesters, was awarded a DSO for making reconnaissances under fire. On 2 September 127 Bde put in an attack on Villers-au-Flos with support from tanks, aircraft, mortars and a creeping barrage, 6th Bn on the left making good progress as the village was enveloped and cleared. The division then exploited this success, and a period of open warfare ensued, with cavalry going into action.

After a period of rest, the division returned to the line for the set-piece assault on the Hindenburg Line (the Battle of the Canal du Nord). 127 Brigade advanced at 08.20 on 27 September with 5th Manchesters leading over the Trescault Ridge to the first objective, after which 6th and 7th Bns passed through to the second and third objectives despite losses from machine guns. By 14.30, a weak company of the 6th Manchesters was on the fourth objective. The 6th and 7th Battalions were now too weak to attempt the final objective, but it was taken that night by the rest of the division, which continued to advance the following morning.

42nd Division next participated in the Battle of the Selle. The divisional Royal Engineers bridged the River Selle on the nights of 17–19 October and the attack went in at 02.00 on 20 October. 127 Brigade set off at 07.00 and passed through towards the second objective. Although the leading company of 6th Manchesters suffered casualties from machine gun nests, these were successfully cleared out and the battalion captured the village of Marou. Although the men of 6th Bn were anxious to carry on to the third objective, they were ordered to consolidate until the 5th Bn on their right could catch up. The Germans massed for a counter-attack at midday, but this was broken up by artillery and machine gun fire and 127 Bde captured its final objective that afternoon. When the advance was resumed on 23 October 127 Bde was in support. During the subsequent pursuit (3–11 November), it remained in support, marching through the Forest of Mormal and across the River Sambre behind 42nd Division's advanced guards until the Armistice with Germany came into effect on 11 November.

42nd Division remained at Hautmont on the Sambre during November, then moved to Charleroi where demobilisation began. As the men went home the division's units were reduced to cadres by 16 March 1919, and 6th Bn was disembodied on 10 April.

==== Commanding officers ====
The following officers served as CO of the 1/6th Manchesters during the war:

- Lt-Col G.G.P. Heywood
- Lt-Col C.R. Pilkington, CMG
- Lt-Col C.S. Worthington, DSO, TD
- Lt-Col G.H. Wedgwood, DSO (promoted to command 126th (East Lancashire) Brigade 25 May 1918)
- Lt-Col T. Blatherwick, DSO, MC

=== 2/6th Battalion ===
The 2/6th Bn was formed at Hulme in August 1914 and shortly afterwards was included in the 2/1st Manchester Brigade of 2nd East Lancashire Division. There was a great shortage of arms and equipment, and the 2nd Line Lancashire units had to train with .256-in Japanese Ariska rifles until the end of 1915. Training was also interrupted by the need to supply reinforcement drafts to the 1/6th Bn overseas. It was not until August 1915 that the division (now numbered as the 66th (2nd East Lancashire), with the 2/1st Manchester Bde as 199 (Manchester)) was able to concentrate in Kent and Sussex. By the end of the month all Home Service men had left to join Provisional Battalions (see below). Early in 1916 the division was transferred to coastal defence duties in East Anglia, but training was still hindered by the requirement to supply drafts to the 42nd Division. It was not until 1 January 1917 that the division was declared ready for overseas service.

The division began embarking at the end of February, and was concentrated at Berguette and Thiennes by 16 March. It served in the desultory operations along the Flanders coast in the summer, then moved to the Ypres salient in October to join the Third Ypres Offensive.

==== Poelcapelle ====
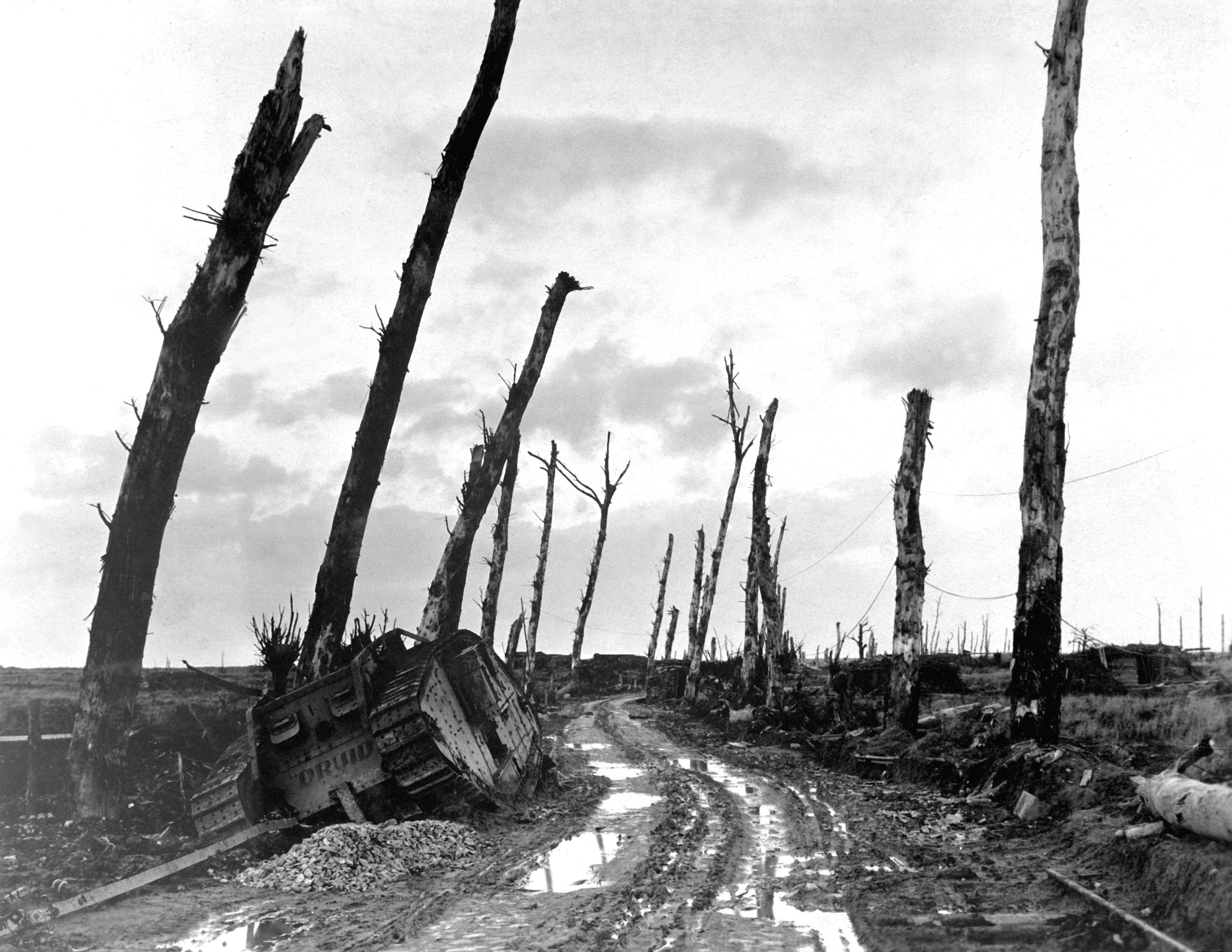
A street corner in Poelcapelle, 1917.

The division's first attack was on 9 October at the Battle of Poelcappelle. Its role was to advance up a ridge to the outskirts of the village of Passchendaele. Ground conditions were bad, but it was believed that there was no German wire to negotiate. The division began its 2.5 miles (4.0 km) approach march at 19.00 the evening before, and was expected to be resting at its jumping-off line by midnight. But the mud was so bad that the troops arrived 20 minutes after the attack was launched, and simply fixed bayonets and kept walking. As well as the mud, which seriously hindered movement, clogged weapons and deadened artillery fire, they were faced by unanticipated barbed wire. The artillery had made no impression on German pillboxes. Although patrols from 66th Division did reach Passchendaele, by the end of the day all temporary gains had been wiped out, and the division did note even hold a consolidated line.

==== Operation Michael ====
When the German Spring Offensive opened, 66th Division had recently been moved from Ypres to Fifth Army and was holding a line among the undulating valleys of the River Somme's tributaries. Reconnaissance had revealed strange new holes in No man's land, which turned out to be forming-up points for the German Stormtroopers. The divisional front was held by three battalions in the Forward Zone and three out of the other six in the Battle Zone. 2/6th Manchesters was among the battalions held back from the Battle Zone, but the divisional commander had forbidden them to move into position until the battle actually started. Aided by early morning fog, the German attack on 21 March quickly broke through the Forward Zone, isolating the battalions, and continued into the Battle Zone.

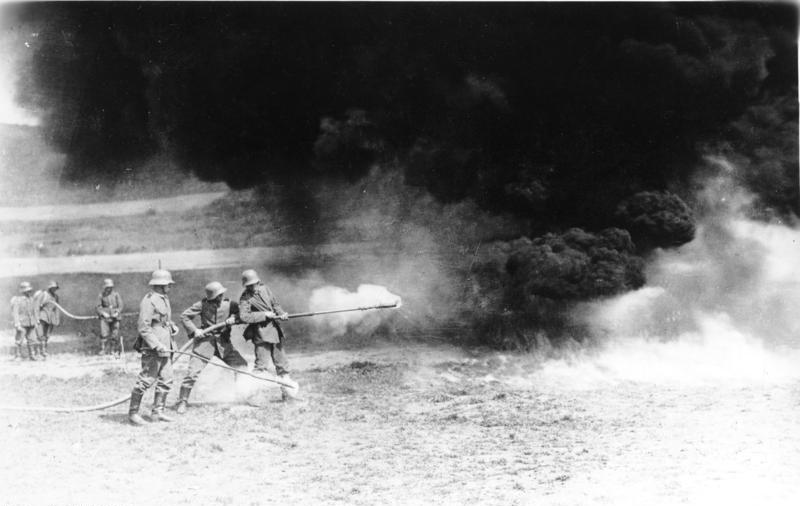
German flamethrower troops 1914–18

The Manchesters now had to march up to their allotted positions under gas shelling, 2/6th Bn moving up the hill from Montigny towards Hervilly, which was under heavy shellfire, and into Hervilly Wood. Casualties had been light so far, but between 11.00 and 11.15 the Germans advancing in the fog split the battalion and surrounded both A and C Companies. Battalion HQ formed a defensive line and 2/6th Manchesters held on at Fervague Farm for several hours, until driven out at 13.00 by flamethrowers. Many of the survivors were captured, and when the battalion reached Carpenza Copse it consisted of only 12 officers and 150 men. Here, under the command of Maj John Whitworth and joined by some dismounted cavalry, they held on doggedly until 14.00 on 22 March before falling back under cover of fog to the 'Green Line' at Hébécourt, where 50th (Northumbrian) Division was hurriedly digging in.

The remnants of 66th Division took up position on the Somme Canal at Péronne, where 2/5th and 2/6th Manchesters held 'Bristol Bridge' for the retiring rearguards of 16th (Irish) Division until the Germans entered Peronne late on 24 March. The bridge was then demolished at 18.00 by 180th Tunnelling Company, RE, and the retreat continued to Rosières, where the division narrowly escaped being surrounded, until Germans were halted by a new defence line on the River Luce.

66th Division had suffered some of the heaviest casualties during the battle, and in April its battered battalions were reduced to training cadres. 2/6th Manchesters was disbanded on 31 July, the remaining personnel being transferred to the 1/6th Bn in 42nd Division.

=== 3/6th Battalion ===
This battalion was formed at Hulme in March 1915, with the role of training drafts for the 1/6th and 2/6th Bns. Early in 1916 it moved to Witley. On 8 April that year it was renamed the 6th Reserve Bn, Manchester Regiment, and on 1 September it was absorbed into the 5th Reserve Bn.

=== 28th Battalion ===
The Home Service men of the 6th Manchesters, together with those of other TF battalions of the Manchesters and Lancashire Fusiliers, were combined into 45th Provisional Battalion, which became 28th Manchesters on 1 January 1917. It served in 73rd Division and was disbanded in 1918.

== Interwar ==
42nd (East Lancashire) Division began reforming at home in April 1920. When the TF was reconstituted as the Territorial Army (TA) in 1921, the 6th Manchesters was combined with the 7th Battalion (originally the 3rd Manchester RVC) and reformed at Hulme as the 6th/7th Battalion, Manchester Regiment in 127 (Manchester) Brigade of 42nd Division on 31 December.

In the 1930s the increasing need for anti-aircraft (AA) defence for Britain's cities was addressed by converting a number of TA infantry battalions into AA brigades of the Royal Artillery (RA). The 6th/7th Manchesters was one unit selected for this role, becoming 65th (The Manchester Regiment) Anti-Aircraft Brigade, RA (TA) on 10 December 1936, still based at Hulme. The unit consisted of 181, 182, 183 and 196 Batteries, and initially formed part of 33rd (Western) Anti-Aircraft Group in 2nd AA Division. On 1 January 1939 the RA adopted the more normal terminology of 'regiment' instead of 'brigade', which allowed the AA groups to adopt the designation of 'brigades'. By then, the 33rd AA Bde had moved to 4th AA Division in Anti-Aircraft Command, and by the outbreak of war in September, 65th AA Regiment had moved to a new 44 AA Brigade within 4 AA Division.

(On 31 July 1939, as part of the doubling in size of the TA before the outbreak of war, new 6th and 7th Battalions of the Manchester Regiment were created as duplicates of the 5th and 8th (Ardwick) Battalions respectively; these served as infantry during the Second World War.)

== Second World War ==
=== Mobilisation and Phoney War ===
The TA's AA units were mobilised on 23 September 1938 during the Munich Crisis, with units manning their emergency positions within 24 hours, even though many did not yet have their full complement of men or equipment. The emergency lasted three weeks, and they were stood down on 13 October. In February 1939 the existing AA defences came under the control of a new Anti-Aircraft Command. In June a partial mobilisation of TA units was begun in a process known as 'couverture', whereby each AA unit did a month's tour of duty in rotation to man selected AA and searchlight positions. 65th AA Regiment was at a practice camp at Burrow Head in Scotland when AA Command was fully mobilised on 24 August, ahead of the declaration of war. It immediately travelled back to man its war stations and was joined by its attached Auxiliary Territorial Service (ATS) company, which had been training at Manorbier in Wales.

Initially, the regiment manned sites with old 3-inch guns and a few modern 3.7-inch static guns. The first 4.5-inch guns began arriving in November. Surplus men manned Lewis light machine guns (LMGs) at Vital Points (VPs) including 181 Bty at Kearsley Power Station. A single 3-inch gun of the regiment was posted at Baxter's respirator (gas mask) factory at Leyland. By November the regiment was distributed as follows:

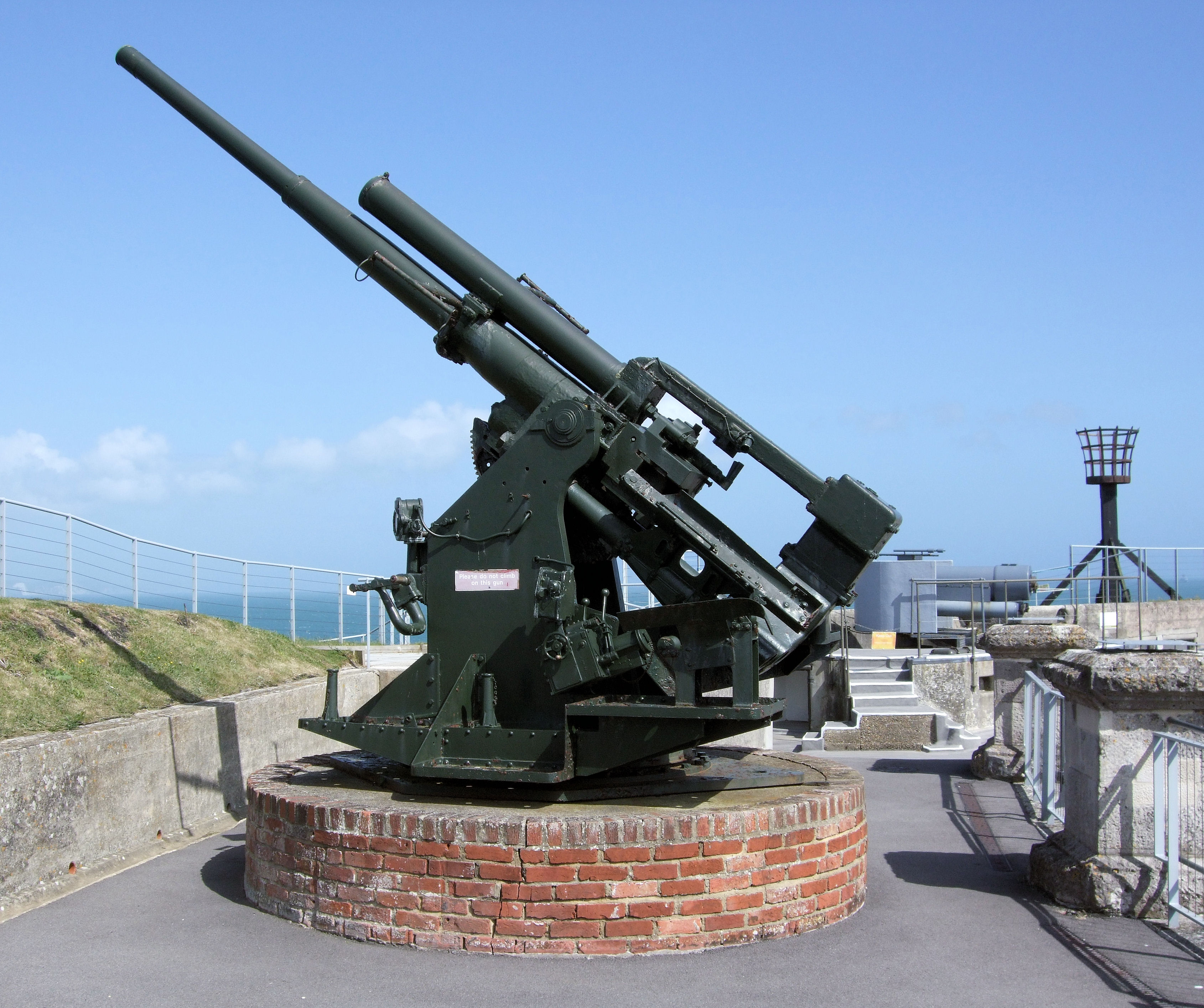
Static 3.7-inch HAA gun, preserved at Nothe Fort.

- 181 Bty: De Havilland factory at Lostock – 24 x LMGs
- 182 Bty: Manchester docks and Anglo-American Oil Co – 32 LMGs
- 183 Bty:
  - B Gunsite, Harpurhey – 4 x 4.5-inch
  - H Gunsite, Belle Vue – 4 x 3.7-inch
- 196 Bty:
  - G Gunsite, Chorlton – 2 x 3-inch
  - J Gunsite, Peel Green – 2 x 3-inch
  - M Gunsite, Pendlebury – 2 x 3-inch

196 Battery fired the regiment's first shots on 17 November when J Gunsite engaged a single Heinkel He 111 that entered the area. The VPs were soon taken over by specialist Light AA (LAA) units. On 1 June 1940, the RA's AA regiments were redesignated Heavy AA (HAA) to distinguish them from the newer LAA units being formed, the 65th becoming 65th (The Manchester Regiment) Heavy Anti-Aircraft Regiment, RA.

=== Battle of Britain ===
In June 1940, after the end of the Phoney War and the Dunkirk evacuation, 65th HAA Rgt was distributed as follows:

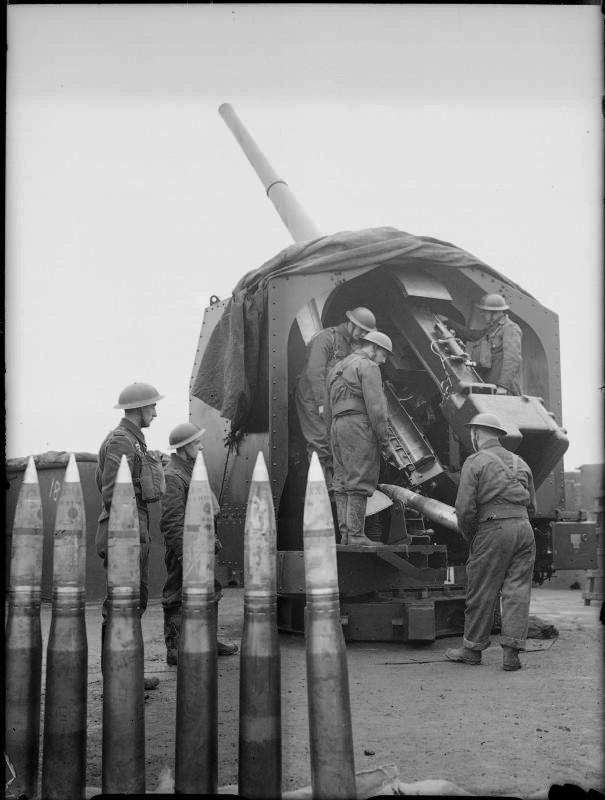
4.5-inch HAA gun, 1941.

- RHQ: Stretford Road
- 181 HAA Bty:
  - A, G & D Gunsites, Manchester
  - Three sections detached to 33 AA Bde at Liverpool
  - One section guarding Tycroes practice camp
- 182 HAA Bty:
  - E Gunsite, Belle Vue
  - H Gunsite, Stretford
  - Detachment at Ringway Aerodrome
- 183 HAA Bty:
  - B Gunsite, Harpurhey
  - F Gunsite, Chorlton
- 196 HAA Bty
  - J Gunsite, Peel Green
  - M Gunsite, Pendleton

During the height of the post-Dunkirk invasion scare in July 1940, 181 HAA Bty was temporarily detached to 6th HAA Rgt in 2 AA Bde in Kent. This regiment was involved in a defence scheme codenamed 'Bovril' to defend roads leading inland from possible invasion sites on the South Coast and was also reconnoitring the area for future AA gunsites.

In August, 181 HAA Bty was once again attached to 6th HAA Rgt, now stationed in the West Midlands, to allow that regiment's batteries to attend practice camps. It manned gunsites H1 at Coven Heath and H18 at Merry Hill.

As the Battle of Britain progressed, small numbers of Luftwaffe bombers appeared over North West England by day and night, leading to a few AA engagements and a small amount of damage. These increased in late August, with considerable damage in the Bolton and Chorley areas on the night of 28/29 August. Gunsites B and J opened fire using the new GL Mk I gunlaying radar, causing some raiders to take evasive action.

=== Home Defence ===
At the beginning of October, 65th HAA Rgt went to the Orkney & Shetland Defence Force (OSDEF), where it served in 58 AA Bde defending the naval base at Scapa Flow.

The regiment supplied a cadres of experienced officers and other ranks to provide the basis for a new 402 HAA Bty formed on 12 December 1940 at 210th HAA Training Rgt, Oswestry, which joined 123rd HAA Rgt. The regiment provided another cadre to 211th HAA Training Rgt, Oswestry, which formed 432 HAA Bty on 8 May 1941. This battery did return to 65th HAA Rgt on 6 August, replacing 182 Bty transferred to newly formed 128th HAA Rgt.

The regiment returned to mainland UK in June 1941, joining 34 AA Bde defending Birmingham and Coventry in 11 AA Division.

In the autumn of 1941 the regiment moved again, joining 51 AA Bde in 3 AA Division in Scotland. On 4 November 1941, 432 HAA Bty transferred to 136th HAA Rgt and was replaced by 465 HAA Bty, also from a cadre supplied by the regiment and formed at 209th HAA Training Rgt at Blandford on 7 August. The regiment then left AA Command in December and joined the War Office Reserve, preparatory to going overseas. The war establishment for overseas service was three batteries, so 465 HAA Bty left to help form a new 146th HAA Rgt.

=== Overseas ===
65th HAA Regiment left the UK in January 1942 as part of the reinforcements for the Far East following the Japanese invasion of Malaya. It reached Ceylon in March, and Imperial Japanese Navy Air Service raids against Colombo and Trincomalee began on 5 April (the Easter Sunday Raid) using Nakajima B5N 'Kate' bombers escorted by Mitsubishi A6M Zero fighters. Lacking effective radar cover the HAA gunners had difficulty engaging their targets against strong dazzle from the sun but claimed a number of 'kills'. The Japanese Naval aircraft raided again on 9 April, causing further damage. Over succeeding months the AA defences were improved, with GL Mk II radar, and the Japanese threat diminished.

By degrees, the AA defences of Ceylon were taken over by Indian Artillery units and the British regiments were released for service elsewhere. In March 1943, 65th HAA Rgt sailed with 181, 183 and 196 Btys to join Middle East Forces, and by May it was with 8 AA Bde at Tahag in Egypt. This formation was not yet operational but was training for the Allied invasion of Italy.

In the event, 8 AA Bde did not move to Italy until December 1943, and 65th HAA Rgt did not go with it. It returned to Home Forces in August 1944 and remained in the UK for the remainder of the war. The regiment with 181, 183 and 196 HAA Btys was placed in suspended animation on 15 June 1946.

== Postwar ==
When the TA was reconstituted in 1947, the regiment reformed as 465 (Manchester) HAA Regiment RA, with its HQ still at Stretford Road, Hulme. It formed part of 70 AA Bde (the former 44 AA Bde based at Salford).

On 10 March 1955, AA Command was abolished, and there were wholesale disbandments and amalgamations among its units. 465 HAA Regiment was merged with 310 (8th Bn Lancashire Fusiliers), 360, 574 (7th Bn Lancashire Fusiliers), and 606 (East Lancashire) HAA Rgts to form 314 Heavy AA Regiment, RA, with RHQ at Hulme, and P (Manchester) Battery formed from 465 and 606 HAA Rgts.

In May 1961, 314 HAA Rgt was broken up, with RHQ and P Bty amalgamated into 252 (The Manchester Artillery) Field Regiment, RA, whose present-day descendants are part of 103rd (Lancashire Artillery Volunteers) Regiment, RA.

== Insignia ==
During the Second World War, the 65th HAA Regiment wore a printed arm badge consisting of a yellow letter 'M' on a green square.

== Battle Honours ==
The battalion was awarded the battle honour South Africa 1900–1902 for the service of its volunteers during the 2nd Boer War. During the First World War, the battalion contributed to the honours of the Manchester Regiment. The Royal Artillery does not carry Battle Honours, so none were awarded to 65th HAA Regiment.

== Honorary Colonels ==
The following officers served as Honorary Colonel of the unit:

- Arthur Egerton, 3rd Earl of Wilton (former CO) appointed 14 October 1863
- Capt (Hon Col) B.C.P. Heywood, TD, appointed 21 January 1914
- Gen Hon Sir Herbert Lawrence, appointed 6 January 1917.
- Gen Sir Reginald Wingate, Bt, was appointed Hon Col of the 7th Manchesters on 16 December 1914; after the merger of the battalions he and Lawrence served as joint Hon Colonels of the 6th/7th Bn and later of the 65th HAA Regiment.
- Col (Hon Brig) Alan Harvey Jones, CBE, TD, appointed 5 August 1952 (until 1961)

== Memorials ==
A memorial plaque to the men of 2nd VB Manchester regiment who served in the Second Boer War is now in the Manchester & Salford University OTC Hall at University Barracks in Boundary Lane. It lists 157 names, of whom six died on service.

On 12 June 1921, a memorial was unveiled at the Stretford Road drill hall comprising dark oak panels bearing the names of 1057 officers and men of the 6th Manchesters who died during the First World War. When the drill hall was demolished and replaced by the new University Barracks in 1995 the panels were re-installed in the new building. A brass plate bearing the names of the members of 1/6th Bn who died in Egypt and Gallipoli was installed in the Chapel of Mustapha Barracks, Alexandria. When British troops left in 1946 the memorial was sent to England and is now also located at University Barracks. There is an elaborate marble memorial plaque in Eye Parish Church in Leominster to the three sons of Lord and Lady Cawley who were killed in the First World War, including Capt H.T. Cawley, MP, of 1/6th Manchesters. Captain Cawley is buried at Lancashire Landing Commonwealth War Graves Commission Cemetery.
