= Peter Rabbit =

Fictional character

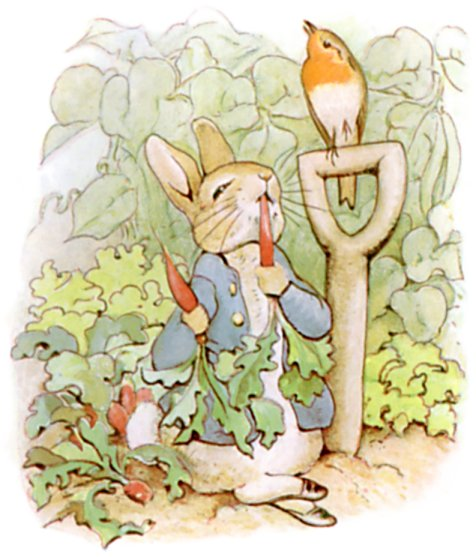
- "First, he ate some lettuces and some French beans; and then, he ate some radishes."
- First appearance: The Tale of Peter Rabbit (1902)
- Created by: Beatrix Potter
- Voiced by: Rory Carty (1992–1994); Mark Lockyer (1995); Cam Clarke (1995); Connor Fitzgerald (2012–2014); Harry Henty (2014–2016); James Corden (2018–2021); Sienna Adams (2019)

In-universe information
- Species: European rabbit
- Gender: Male
- Family: Mr. Rabbit (father, deceased); Mrs. Rabbit (mother); Benjamin Bunny (cousin/brother in-law); Flopsy Rabbit/Flopsy Bunny (sister/cousin-in-law); Mopsy and Cotton-tail (sisters)
- Relatives: Bouncer (uncle); Benjamin and Flopsy's children (nephews and nieces/cousins-once removed) unnamed brother-in-law by Cotton-tail

Peter Rabbit is a fictional animal character in various children's stories by English author Beatrix Potter. A mischievous, adventurous young anthropomorphic rabbit who wears a blue jacket, he first appeared in The Tale of Peter Rabbit in 1902, and subsequently in five more books between 1904 and 1912. The six books by Potter featuring Peter Rabbit have sold over 150 million copies. Spin-off merchandise includes dishes, wallpaper, painting books, board games and dolls. In 1903, Peter Rabbit was the first fictional character to be made into a patented stuffed toy, making him the oldest licensed character.

Peter Rabbit appears as a character in several adaptations, including the television series The World of Peter Rabbit and Friends (1992–1998) and Peter Rabbit (2012–2016), and the live-action/animated films Peter Rabbit (2018) and Peter Rabbit 2: The Runaway (2021).

== Background ==
The rabbits in Potter's stories are anthropomorphic and wear human clothes; Peter wears a blue jacket with brass buttons and shoes. Peter, his widowed mother, Mrs. Rabbit, as well as his younger sisters, Flopsy, Mopsy, and Cottontail (with Peter the eldest of the four little rabbits) live in a rabbit hole that has a human kitchen, human furniture, as well as a shop where Mrs. Rabbit sells various items. Peter's relatives are his cousin Benjamin Bunny and Benjamin's father, Mr. Benjamin Bouncer.

Peter Rabbit was named after a pet rabbit whom Beatrix Potter had as a child, and whom she called Peter Piper. The first Peter Rabbit story, The Tale of Peter Rabbit, was created in 1893 initially as a letter to Noel Moore, the five-year-old son of Potter's former governess, Annie Moore. The boy was ill, and Potter wrote him a picture and story letter to help him pass the time and to cheer him up. The letter included sketches illustrating the narrative.

In June 1903, a trade edition of the tale was published by Frederick Warne & Co, and by the end of the year, 28,000 copies were in print. Over the years, The Tale of Peter Rabbit has sold more than 40 million copies worldwide, and as of 2008, the Peter Rabbit series of six books has sold more than 150 million copies in 35 languages.

The Tale of Peter Rabbit—initial history as a letter to Noel Moore

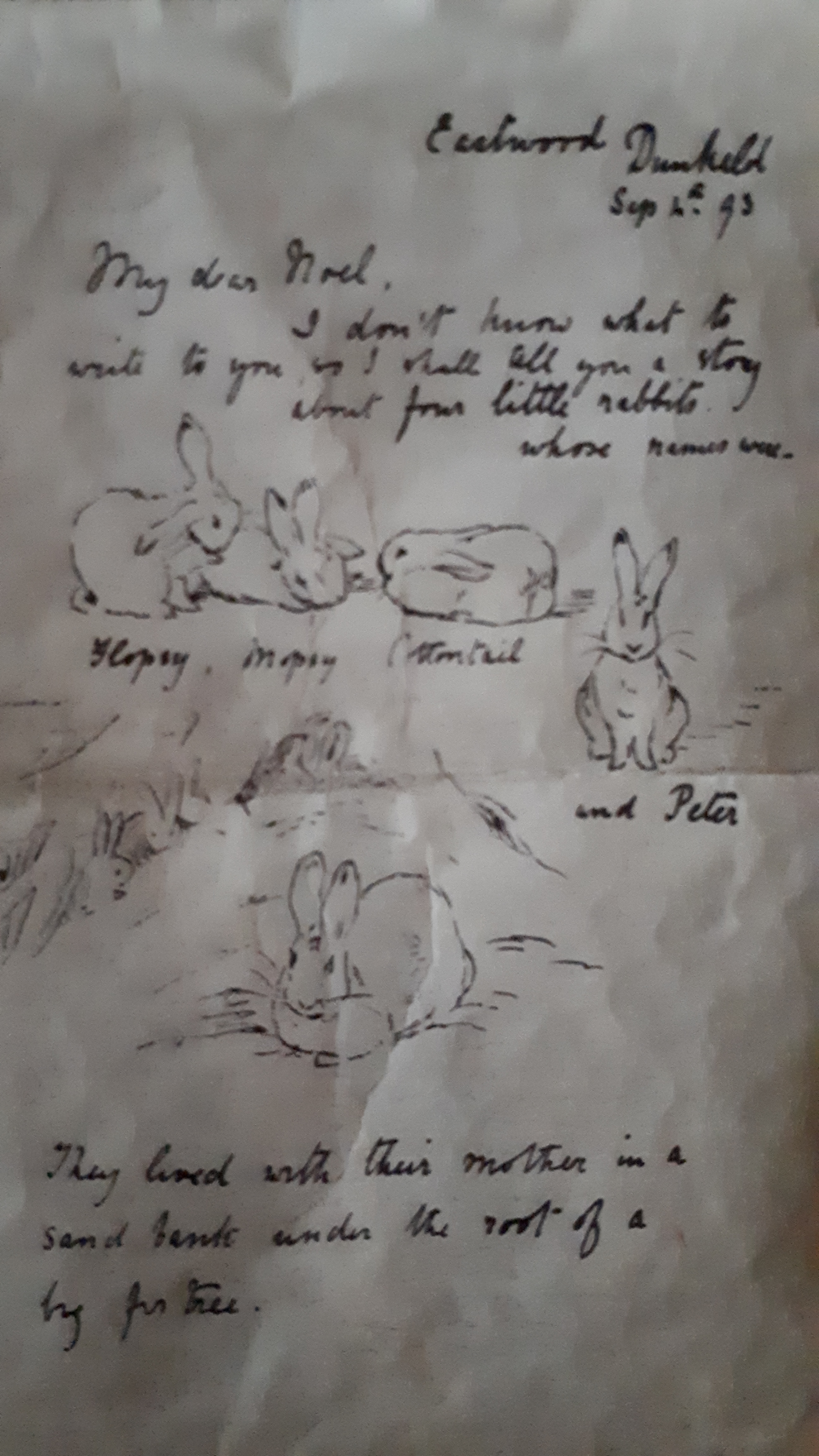

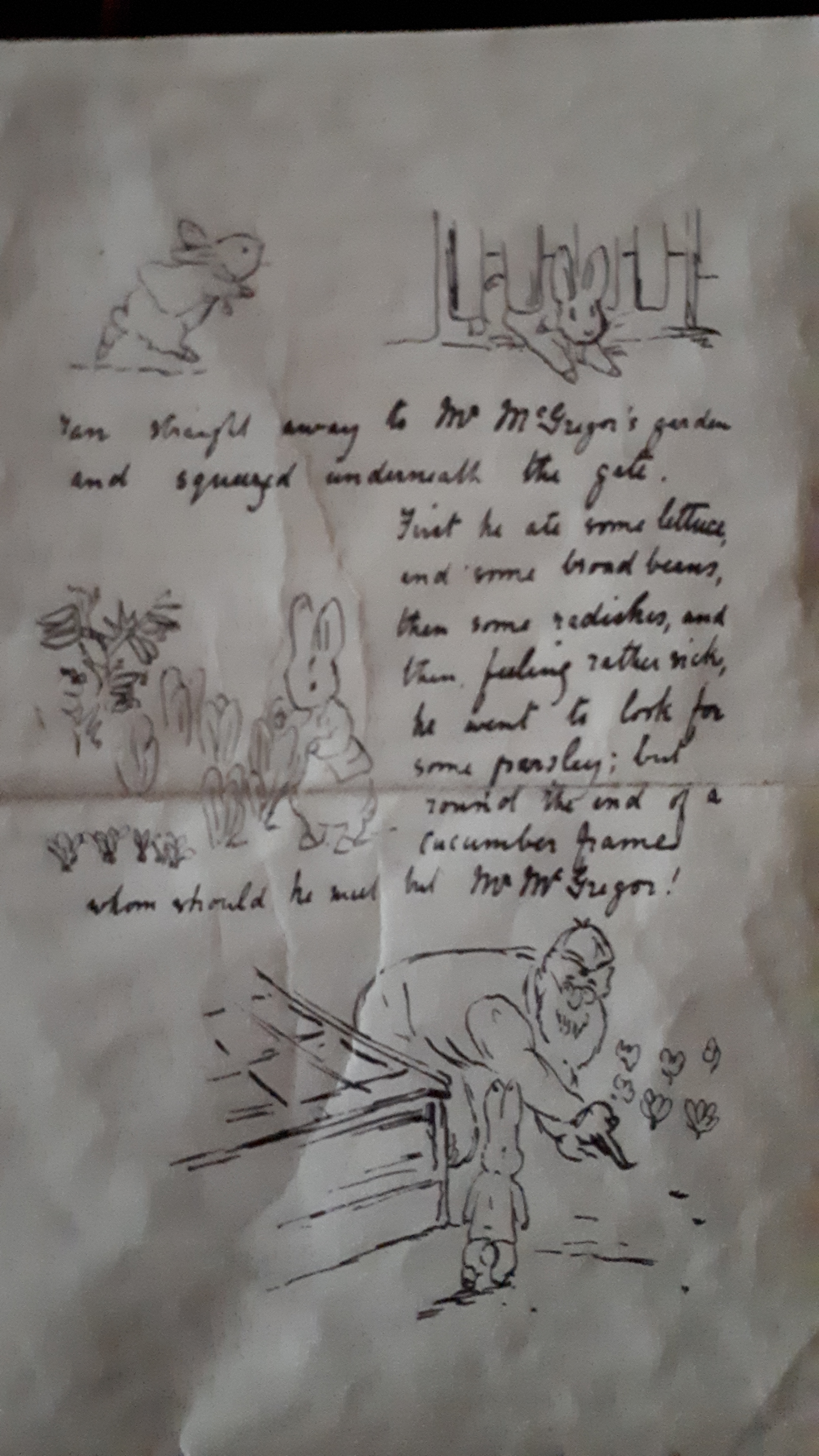

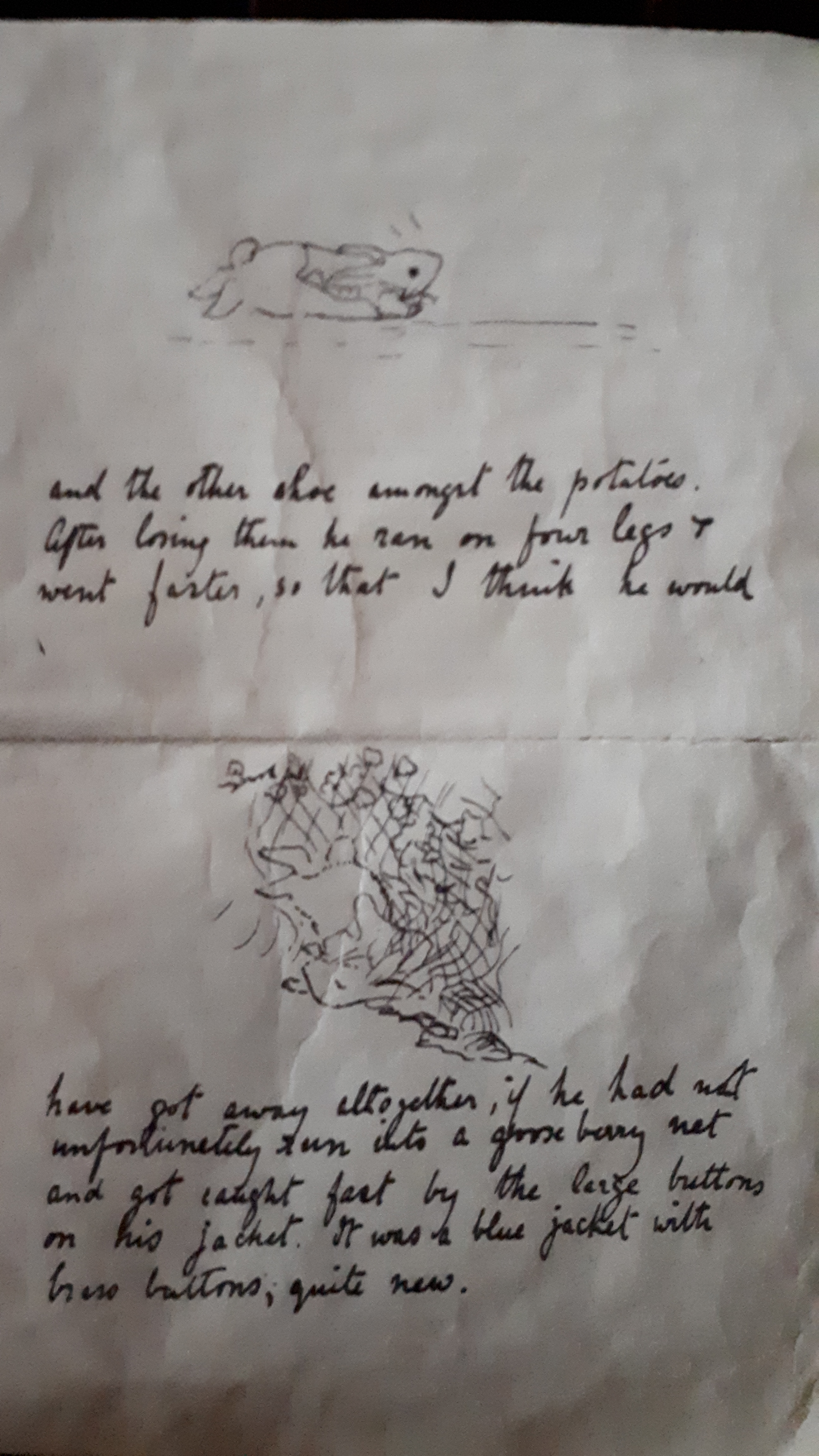

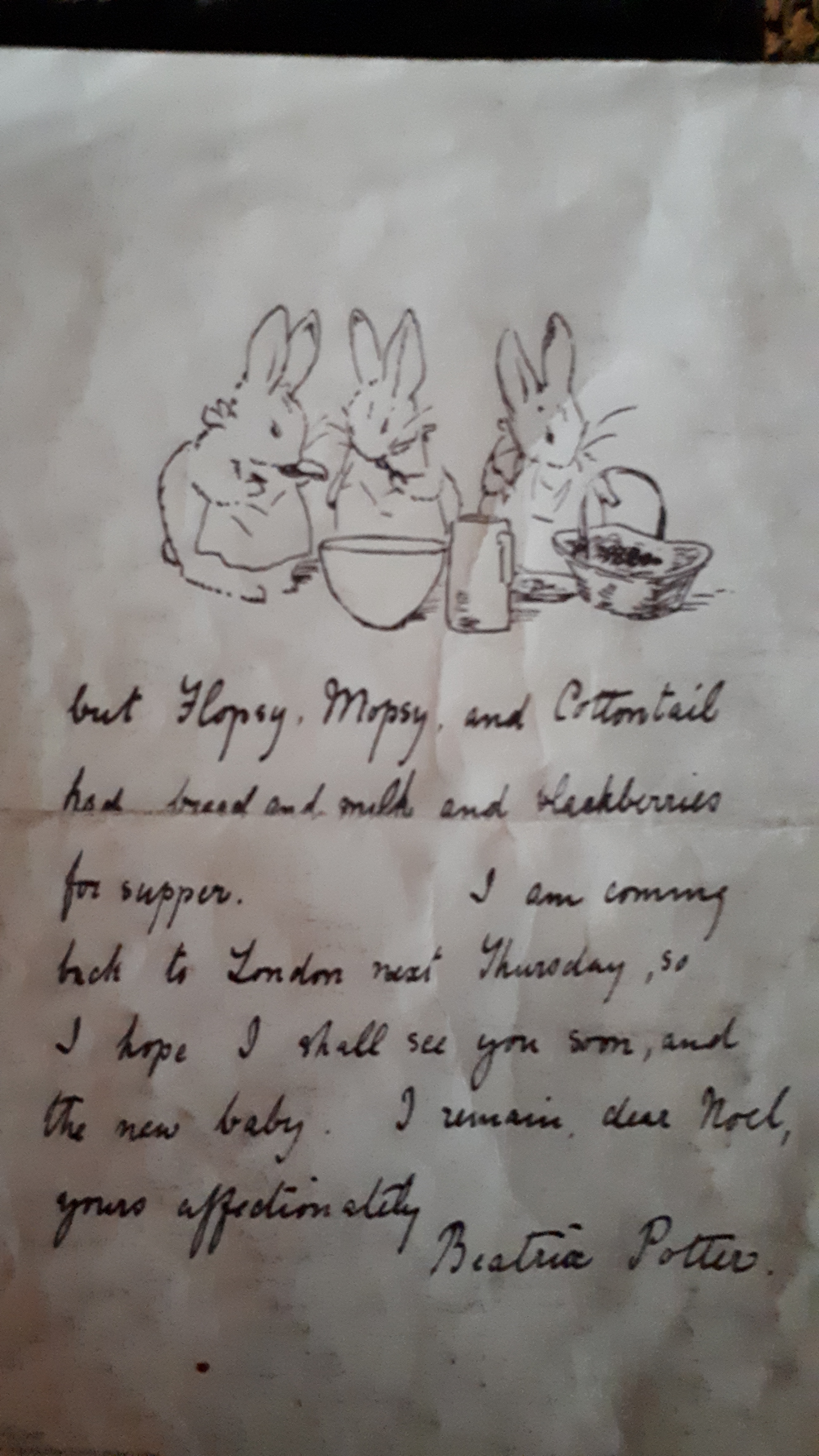

== Books ==
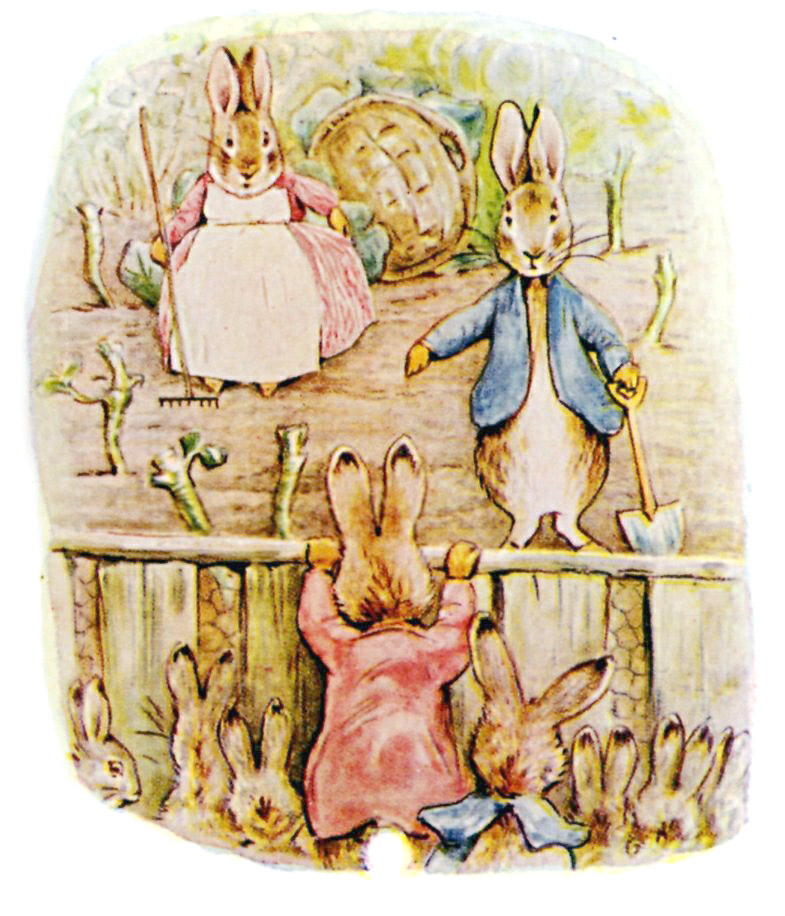
Grown up Peter in his nursery garden, from The Tale of the Flopsy Bunnies

Peter Rabbit made his first appearance in 1902 in The Tale of Peter Rabbit where Peter disobeys his mother's orders and sneaks into Mr. McGregor's garden (where his father had once had "an accident" involving his being put in a pie by Mrs. McGregor). He eats as many vegetables as he can before Mr. McGregor spots and chases him. Peter manages to escape, but not before losing his jacket and shoes, which Mr. McGregor uses to dress a scarecrow. Peter returns home weary, ill, and naked and is put to bed with a dose of chamomile tea.

In The Tale of Benjamin Bunny, first published in 1904, Peter's cousin Benjamin Bunny brings him back to Mr. McGregor's garden and they retrieve the clothes Peter lost in The Tale of Peter Rabbit. However, after they gather onions to give to Peter's mother, they are captured by Mr. McGregor's cat. Bouncer arrives and rescues them, but also punishes Peter and Benjamin for going into the garden by whipping them with a switch. In this tale, Peter displays some trepidation about returning to the garden.

In The Tale of the Flopsy Bunnies, first published in 1909, Peter has a small role and appears only briefly. He is grown up and his sister Flopsy is now married to their cousin Benjamin. The two are the parents of six little Flopsy Bunnies. Peter and his mother keep a nursery garden, (Note: In the original frontispiece, a sign at the garden read, "Peter Rabbit & Mother-Florists-Gardens neatly razed. Borders devastated by the night or year.") and the bunnies come by asking him for spare cabbage.

In The Tale of Mr. Tod, first published in 1912, Benjamin and Flopsy's children are kidnapped by notorious badger Tommy Brock. Peter helps Benjamin chase after Brock, who hides out in the house of the fox, Mr. Tod. Mr. Tod finds Brock sleeping in his bed, and as the two get into a scuffle, Peter and Benjamin rescue the children.

Peter makes cameo appearances in two other tales. In The Tale of Mrs. Tiggy-Winkle, first published in 1905, Peter and Benjamin are customers of Mrs. Tiggy-Winkle, a hedgehog washerwoman. The two rabbits are depicted in one illustration peeping from the forest foliage. In The Tale of Ginger and Pickles, first published in 1909, Peter and other characters from Potter's previous stories make cameo appearances in the artwork, patronising the shop of Ginger and Pickles.

To mark the 110th anniversary of the publication of The Tale of Peter Rabbit, Frederick Warne & Co. commissioned British actress Emma Thompson to write The Further Tale of Peter Rabbit, in which Peter ends up in Scotland after accidentally hitching a ride on Mr. and Mrs. McGregor's wagon. The book was released on 18 September 2012. In autumn 2012, it was reported that Thompson would write more Peter Rabbit books. Her next tale, The Christmas Tale of Peter Rabbit, was released in 2013, followed by The Spectacular Tale of Peter Rabbit in 2014.

On 27 May 2021, a reboot of Peter Rabbit was released, entitled Peter Rabbit Head Over Tail, written by Rachel Bright and illustrated by Nicola Kinnear, followed by Peter Rabbit Hide and Seek in 2022, then Peter Rabbit Up and Away in 2024.

== Merchandising ==
Potter created a soft doll depicting Peter Rabbit and a Peter Rabbit board game shortly after the tale's first publication. The character has been depicted in a multitude of spinoff merchandise such as porcelain figurines, painting books and dishes.

Peter Rabbit was the first soft toy to be patented, in 1903, making Peter the oldest licensed character. The following year they went on sale and were mass-produced by Steiff. Harrods department store in London has been selling it since at least 1910, when toys of Potter characters first appeared in their catalogues. The British publisher Frederick Warne & Co owns the trademark rights of the Beatrix Potter characters.

The Peter Rabbit (rather than other Beatrix Potter characters) stories and merchandise are very popular in Japan: many Japanese tourists visit the Lake District after becoming familiar with Potter's work at an early age at school. There is an accurate replica of Potter's house and a theme park in Japan, and a series of Mr. McGregor's gardens in one of the largest banks. Merchandisers in Japan estimate that 80% of the population have heard of Peter Rabbit.

== Commemoration ==
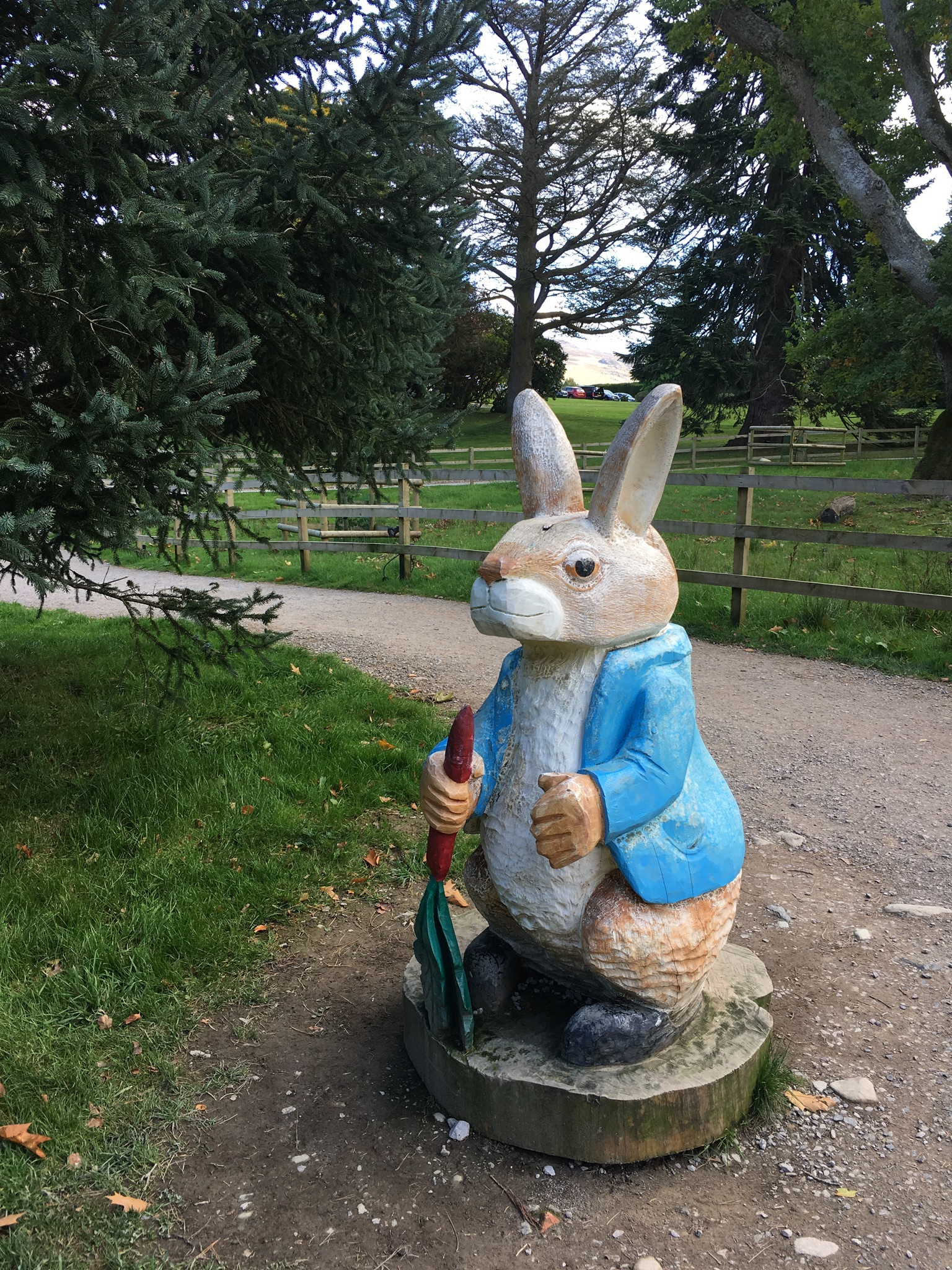
Peter Rabbit statue at Lingholm country house in the English Lake District

A statue of Peter Rabbit is located on the grounds of Lingholm country house just outside the village of Portinscale in the Lake District, north west England, where Potter spent her summer holidays (between 1885 and 1907) and where she drew inspiration for her Peter Rabbit books. She credited the Lingholm kitchen garden as her original inspiration for Mr. McGregor's garden in The Tale of Peter Rabbit. Lingholm was listed Grade II on the National Heritage List for England in 2013.

In 2016, Peter Rabbit and other Potter characters featured on a series of UK postage stamps issued by the Royal Mail to celebrate the 150th anniversary of Beatrix Potter's birth. The same year, Peter Rabbit and other Potter characters appeared on a small number of collectors' 50p British coins.

== Adaptations ==
In 1936, Walt Disney expressed interest in making a Peter Rabbit film. He proposed his idea of a feature-length film produced by Walt Disney Productions to Beatrix Potter, but she refused and did not give him the rights.

Peter Rabbit appears in the 1971 ballet film, The Tales of Beatrix Potter. He also was featured in HBO's 1991 Storybook Musical adaptation of The Tale of Peter Rabbit, narrated by Carol Burnett. Several of the stories featuring Peter Rabbit were also animated for the 1992 BBC anthology series The World of Peter Rabbit and Friends and two edutainment titles published by Mindscape The Adventures of Peter Rabbit & Benjamin Bunny in 1995 and Beatrix Potter: Peter Rabbit's Math Garden in 1996. An animated children's TV series Peter Rabbit premiered on Nickelodeon and CBeebies in December 2012, with Colin DePaula voicing Peter in its first season (American version) and L. Parker Lucas taking over the role for the second season, respectively.

An animated/live-action adaptation, Peter Rabbit produced by Sony Pictures Animation, was released on 8 February 2018. James Corden voices Peter Rabbit with Domhnall Gleeson and Rose Byrne starring in the live-action role of the lead female named Bea (based on Potter herself). Other cast members include Margot Robbie, Daisy Ridley and Elizabeth Debicki. Will Gluck directed and produced the film, and Zareh Nalbandian also produced, while Lauren Abrahams oversaw the project for Sony Pictures Animation. A sequel Peter Rabbit 2: The Runaway (2021) reunited most of the cast of the previous film.

== See also ==
- The World of Peter Rabbit and Friends (TV series)
- Peter Rabbit (TV series)
- Peter Rabbit (film)
