= John Kemp, 1st Viscount Rochdale =

British peer

The Right Honourable The Viscount Rochdale OBE, TD, DL
- Preceded by: New creation
- Succeeded by: St John Durival Kemp

Personal details
- Born: John Durival Kemp; 5 June 1906
- Died: 24 May 1993 (aged 86)
- Spouse: Elinor Dorothea Pease (after 1931)
- Relations: Francis Egerton, 3rd Earl of Ellesmere (grandfather)
- Children: 2
- Parent(s): George Kemp, 1st Baron Rochdale; Lady Beatrice Mary Egerton
- Education: Eton College
- Alma mater: Trinity College, Cambridge

Brigadier John Durival Kemp, 1st Viscount Rochdale OBE, TD, DL (5 June 1906 – 24 May 1993), was a British peer, soldier and businessman.

== Early life ==
Kemp was the eldest son of George Kemp, 1st Baron Rochdale, and Lady Beatrice Mary Egerton, third daughter of Francis Egerton, 3rd Earl of Ellesmere. His father was a Member of Parliament for Heywood and Manchester North West and served as chairman of Kelsall & Kemp, flannel manufacturers.

He was educated at Eton College and Trinity College, Cambridge where he took a degree in Natural Sciences.

== Career ==
Kemp served in the Second World War with U.S. Forces in the Pacific and with the British Army in India, where he was mentioned in despatches, and achieved the rank of Brigadier. He succeeded to the barony on his father's death in 1945. Lord Rochdale was Chairman of the family firm of Kelsall & Kemp from 1950 to 1971, a Member of the Central Transport Consultative Committees from 1952 to 1957, President of the National Union of Manufacturers from 1953 to 1956, a Governor of the BBC from 1954 to 1959 and Chairman of the Cotton Board from 1957 to 1962, when the industry was suffering significant challenges from imports.

He was also a Member of the House of Lords European Select Committee from 1981 to 1986 and a Deputy Lieutenant of Cumbria from 1948 to 1983. In 1960, he was created Viscount Rochdale, of Rochdale in the County Palatine of Lancaster. Kemp was a Conservative, becoming Chairman of the Rochdale Conservative Association in the 1930s, and on becoming Lord Rochdale in 1945 on the death of his father, he was an active member of the House of Lords. He was at one time President of the Economic League.

== Personal life ==
Lord Rochdale married Elinor Dorothea Pease on 18 March 1931. Elinor was the second daughter of Ernest Hubert Pease, OBE, of Ledge House in Bembridge, Isle of Wight, and Mowden in Darlington. They had two children:

- St John Durival Kemp, 2nd Viscount Rochdale (1938–2015), who married Serena Jane Clark-Hall, daughter of James Edward Michael Clark-Hall in 1960. They divorced in 1974 and he married Elizabeth (née Boldon) Anderton, the former wife of James Michael Anderton and daughter of Robert Norman Rossiter Boldon.
- Hon. Bryony Joy Kemp (1947–1963)

Rochdale died on 24 May 1993.

== Arms ==
Coat of arms of John Kemp, 1st Viscount Rochdale
Coronet A Coronet of a Viscount Crest A cubit arm erect vested Argent cuffed Azure the hand Proper grasping a chaplet Vert encircling a rose as in the arms. Escutcheon Argent a chevron engrailed Gules between two estoiles in chief Azure and a rose of the second in base barbed and seeded Proper. Supporters On either side a ram Or charged on the shoulder with a rose Gules slipped and leaved Proper. Motto Lucem Spero (I Hope For Light)

Peerage of the United Kingdom
New creation	Viscount Rochdale; 1960–1993	Succeeded by St John Durival Kemp
Preceded by George Kemp	Baron Rochdale; 1945–1993	Succeeded by St John Durival Kemp
