= Isaac Hoyle =

Isaac Hoyle (1828 – 2 September 1911) was a British mill-owner and Liberal politician.

Born in Bacup, Lancashire, he was the fourth son of Joshua Hoyle. His father was the founder of Joshua Hoyle and Sons Ltd, cotton manufacturers of Summerseat near Bury. He was educated at Crosbie House, Frodsham, before entering the textile business. He eventually became a director of the family company, and was credited with making the firm a model of good industrial relations.

Politically, Hoyle was a pro-Home Rule Liberal. In 1885 he was elected as Member of Parliament for Heywood, retiring at 1892 general election. He was a magistrate for the City of Manchester and a director of the Manchester Chamber of Commerce.

Hoyle was married twice: to Elizabeth Smallpage, who died in 1870 and to Mary Hamer Kay in 1872.

Hoyle died in 1911 and was buried in Wimbledon, Surrey.

Parliament of the United Kingdom
New constituency	Member for Heywood; 1885–1892	Succeeded by Thomas Snape
