= Viscount Rochdale =

Viscountcy in the Peerage of the United Kingdom

Viscount Rochdale, of Rochdale in the County Palatine of Lancaster, is a title in the Peerage of the United Kingdom. It was created on 20 January 1960 for John Kemp, 2nd Baron Rochdale. He was Chairman of the woollen manufacturing firm of Kelsall & Kemp Ltd and a former President of the National Union of Manufacturers and Governor of the BBC. The title of Baron Rochdale, of Rochdale in the County Palatine of Lancaster, was created in the Peerage of the United Kingdom on 14 February 1913 for his father, George Kemp. He was Chairman of Kelsall & Kemp Ltd, a Brigadier-General in the Army, and former Member of Parliament for South East Lancashire and Manchester North West. As of 2022 the titles are held by his grandson, the third Viscount, who succeeded his father in 2015.

== Barons Rochdale (1913) ==
- George Kemp, 1st Baron Rochdale (1866–1945)
- John Durival Kemp, 2nd Baron Rochdale (1906–1993) (created Viscount Rochdale in 1960)

== Viscounts Rochdale (1960) ==
- John Durival Kemp, 1st Viscount Rochdale (1906–1993)
- St John Durival Kemp, 2nd Viscount Rochdale (1938–2015)
- Jonathan Hugo Durival Kemp, 3rd Viscount Rochdale (b. 1961)

The heir presumptive is the present holder's only nephew George Thomas Kemp (b. 2001)

There are no other heirs in line to the titles.

== Arms ==
Coat of arms of the Viscounts Rochdale
Coronet A Coronet of a Viscount Crest A cubit arm erect vested Argent cuffed Azure the hand Proper grasping a chaplet Vert encircling a rose as in the arms. Escutcheon Argent a chevron engrailed Gules between two estoiles in chief Azure and a rose of the second in base barbed and seeded Proper. Supporters On either side a ram Or charged on the shoulder with a rose Gules slipped and leaved Proper. Motto Lucem Spero (I Hope For Light)
