= Harold Cawley =

British barrister, politician and soldier

Harold Thomas Cawley
- Born: 12 June 1878; Crumpsall
- Died: 23 September 1915 (aged 37); Gallipoli
- Occupations: Barrister, Politician, Soldier
- Political party: Liberal Party

Harold Thomas Cawley MP, circa 1910

Captain Harold Thomas Cawley (12 June 1878 – 23 September 1915) was a British barrister, Liberal Party politician and soldier.

== Background ==
Born at Crumpsall, he was the second son of Frederick Cawley, 1st Baron Cawley and his wife Elizabeth Smith, daughter of John Smith. His younger brother was Oswald Cawley.

Cawley was educated at Rugby School and then at New College, Oxford, where he graduated with a Master of Arts. He was called to the Bar by the Inner Temple in 1902 and went to the Northern Circuit, working in Lancashire. Two years later he joined the 2nd Volunteer Battalion, Manchester Regiment.

== Career ==
Photograph of Harold Thomas Cawley, of the Bury and District Soldiers' Memorial Book, Section 1914–1915, published by the Bury Times

In 1910, Cawley entered the British House of Commons for Heywood, and a year later he was appointed Parliamentary Private Secretary to the Home Secretary Reginald McKenna.

On the outbreak of World War I in 1914 he served with his Territorial Force battalion (now the 6th Battalion, Manchester Regiment and became aide de camp to Major-General William Douglas, the officer commanding 42nd (East Lancashire) Division.

== Death ==
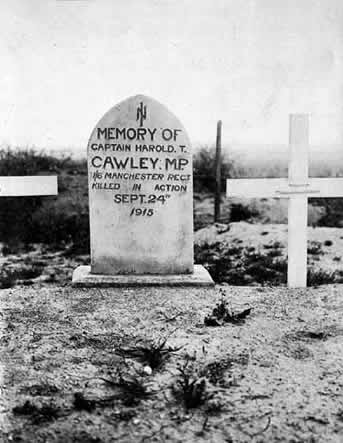
Original grave of Cawley at Gallipoli

The 42nd Division went to Gallipoli in 1915. During September the Turks exploded a series of mines in front of the British trench known as the 'Gridiron' and damaging its defences. Repairs after one mine on 22 September were covered by a bombing party of 1/6th Battalion Manchester Regiment who held the lip of the crater. The same day the Royal Engineers exploded a counter-mine and the Manchesters rushed the crater and built a barrier across it. Captain Cawley, serving with 1/6th Bn, was killed that night by a Turkish sniper, and the crater became known as 'Cawley's Crater'. Before his death, he sent a letter to his father, at that time representative of Prestwich in the Parliament of the United Kingdom.

As a Member of Parliament the letter was not subject to military censorship, and it reported the mishandling of the Dardanelles campaign in some detail. Cawley is buried at Lancashire Landing Cemetery in Gallipoli.

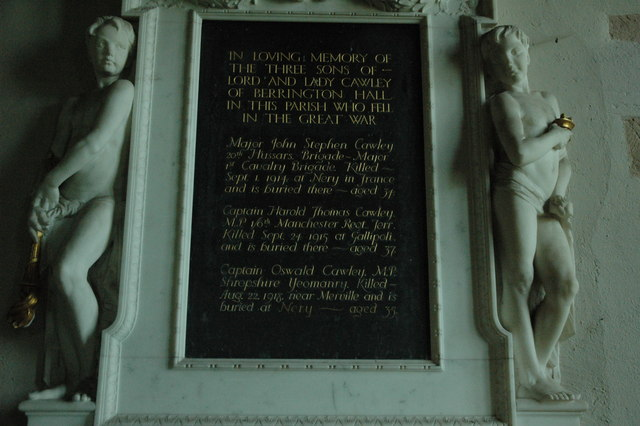
Memorial to the Cawley brothers in St Peter and St Paul Church, Eye, Herefordshire

It was in memory of Harold and two other sons – Oswald and John – who died in the war that their father endowed a ward at Ancoats Hospital, Manchester, in 1919 at a cost of £10,000.

All three brothers are commemorated on the Parliamentary War Memorial in Westminster Hall. Harold and Oswald, on Panel 8, are among the 22 MPs that died during World War I to be named on that memorial. John, included on the memorial as the son of an MP, appears on Panel 2 of the memorial. Harold Cawley is one of 19 MPs who fell in the war who are commemorated by heraldic shields in the Commons Chamber.

A further act of commemoration came with the unveiling in 1932 of a manuscript-style illuminated book of remembrance for the House of Commons, which includes short biographical accounts of the life and death of the Cawley brothers.

Parliament of the United Kingdom
Preceded by Sir Edward Hopkinson Holden	Member of Parliament for Heywood; January 1910 – 1915	Succeeded by Albert Holden Illingworth
