= Sir Edward Holden, 1st Baronet =

British politician

Sir Edward Holden, Bt
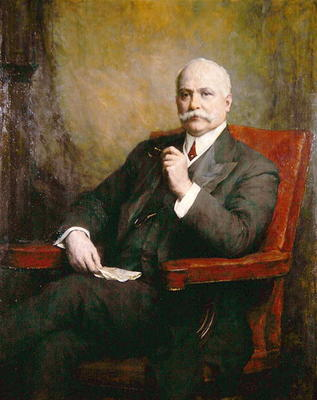
- Portrait (1911), oil on canvas by Walter William Ouless
- Born: Edward Hopkinson Holden; 11 May 1848; Tottington, Lancashire
- Died: 23 July 1919 (aged 71); Duff House Sanatorium, Banff, Banffshire
- Education: Owens College, Manchester
- Occupation: banker
- Title: baronet
- Political party: Liberal
- Board member of: Midland Bank (chairman)
- Spouse: Annie Cassie (1877)

Sir Edward Hopkinson Holden, 1st Baronet (11 May 1848 – 23 July 1919) was a British banker and Liberal politician, most notable for his role in developing the Midland Bank into the largest bank in the world.

== Family ==
Hopkinson was born at the Bull's Head, Tottington, Lancashire. He was the eldest son of Henry Holden, a calico bleacher and Ann Hopkinson. He was educated at Summerseat Methodist Primary School.

After working as a clerk in local businesses, he entered banking in 1866 as an apprentice at the Bolton branch of the Manchester and County Bank. At the same time he was continuing his education by attending evening classes at Owen's College, Manchester, studying political economy, logic and law.

In 1877 he married Annie Cassie of Aberdeen, and they had three children. They made their home at The Grange, Thorpe, near Chertsey, Surrey. His wife died in 1905.

== Banking career ==
In 1881 he became accountant at the Birmingham and Midland Bank, and in 1883 he was promoted to secretary. He was involved in the bank's expansion, as it absorbed a large number of banks in central and northern England. He continued to be promoted: to sub-manager in 1887, general manager in 1890, and joint general manager in 1891. In 1898 he personally negotiated the merger with the London-based City Bank, and was to be managing director of the resulting London, City and Midland Bank until his death. He was also appointed chairman of the renamed Midland Bank in 1908 and continued the policy of expansion and acquisition. By 1918, with deposits of £335 million, it ranked as the largest bank in the world.

== Political career ==
In 1906 Holden was elected as Liberal Member of Parliament for Heywood, Lancashire. In 1908 he was considered for the post of Chancellor of the Exchequer in succession to H. H. Asquith. However, the office was given to David Lloyd George, following his threat to resign from the cabinet. Holden did not contest the next general election in 1910.

On 21 July 1909 Holden was created a baronet, "of the Grange in the County of Surrey". He declined the offer of a peerage on two occasions.

Despite his retirement from parliamentary politics, Holden remained an economic adviser to the government. He was part of a commission sent to New York City in 1915 to help stabilise exchange rates, and helped raise a loan negotiated by the Anglo-French Financial Commission in 1915.

Holden developed heart disease in his final year, and died suddenly at Duff House Sanatorium in Banff, Banffshire (now Aberdeenshire) of cerebral thrombosis and heart failure.

Parliament of the United Kingdom
Preceded by George Kemp	Member of Parliament for Heywood; 1906 – January 1910	Succeeded by Harold Thomas Cawley
Baronetage of the United Kingdom
New creation	Baronet (of The Grange); 1909 – 1919	Succeeded by Harry Cassie Holden
