= Albert Illingworth, 1st Baron Illingworth =

British politician

The Right Honourable The Lord Illingworth PC
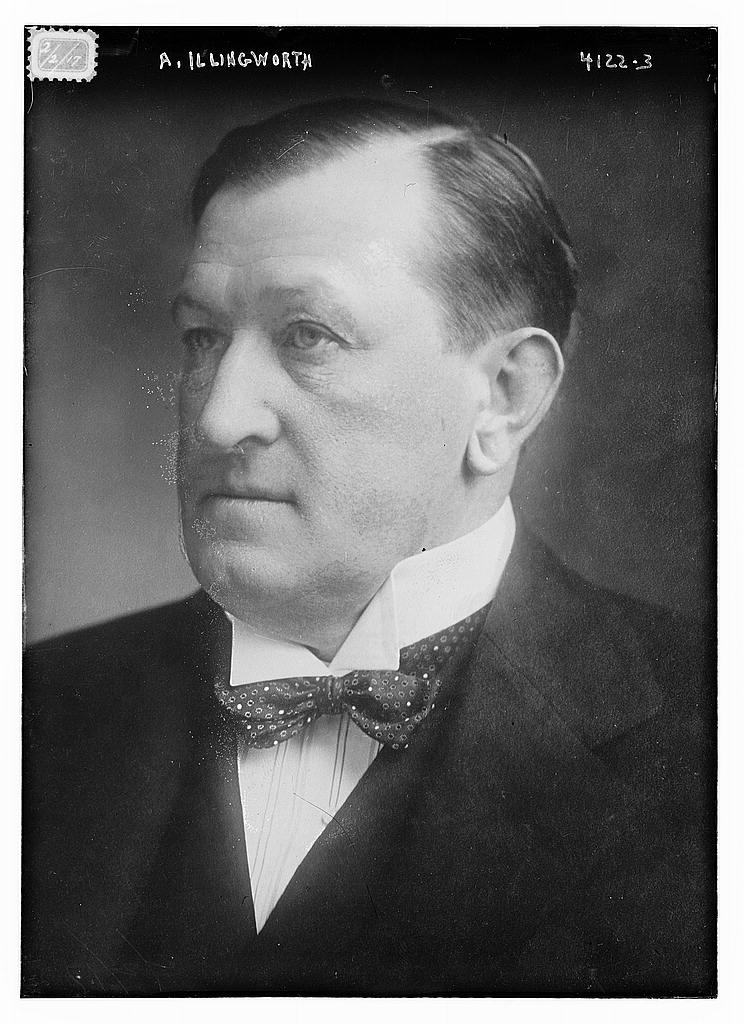

Postmaster General
- In office 10 December 1916 – 1 April 1921
- Monarch: George V
- Prime Minister: David Lloyd George
- Preceded by: Jack Pease
- Succeeded by: F. G. Kellaway

Member of Parliament for Heywood and Radcliffe Heywood (1915–1918)
- In office 10 November 1915 – 31 May 1921
- Preceded by: Harold Cawley
- Succeeded by: Walter Halls

Personal details
- Born: Albert Holden Illingworth; 25 May 1865 Bradford, Yorkshire, England, UK
- Died: 23 January 1942 (aged 76) Markington, Yorkshire, England, UK
- Party: Liberal (Before 1916, 1923–1942)
- Other party: Coalition Liberal (1916–1922); National Liberal (1922–1923)
- Spouses: Annie Crothers (m. 1895; div. 1926) Margaret Wilberforce (1900-1986) (m. 1931)
- Parents: Henry Illingworth (father); Mary Holden (mother)
- Relatives: Percy Illingworth (brother)

Albert Holden Illingworth, 1st Baron Illingworth, PC (25 May 1865 – 23 January 1942), was a British businessman and Liberal politician. He served as Postmaster General between 1916 and 1921 in David Lloyd George's coalition government.

== Background and education ==
Illingworth was the second son of Henry Illingworth, of Bradford, the member of an old Yorkshire family, and his wife Mary, daughter of Sir Isaac Holden, 1st Baronet. Percy Illingworth was his younger brother. His sister, Mary Gertrude Darnton (née Illingworth, 1871-1952), married in 1894 John Edward Darnton (formerly Schunck), brother of Baroness Airedale née Florence Schunck. Illingworth was educated at the London International College and became a partner in the family firm of Daniel Illingworth and Sons, spinners, and Chairman of Isaac Holden et Fils.

== Political career ==
In a 1915 by-election Illingworth was returned to Parliament for Heywood, a seat he held until the constituency was abolished in 1918, and then sat for Heywood and Radcliffe until 1921. He served under David Lloyd George as Postmaster General from 1916 to 1921 and was sworn of the Privy Council in 1916.

In 1921 he was raised to the peerage as Baron Illingworth, of Denton in the West Riding of the County of York. The territorial designation derived from Denton Hall which he had purchased in 1920. However, the estate was sold already in 1925. Following his elevation to the peerage, the Heywood and Radcliffe constituency was won in the subsequent by-election by the Labour candidate Walter Halls, a farm labourer employed by Illingworth.

== Family ==
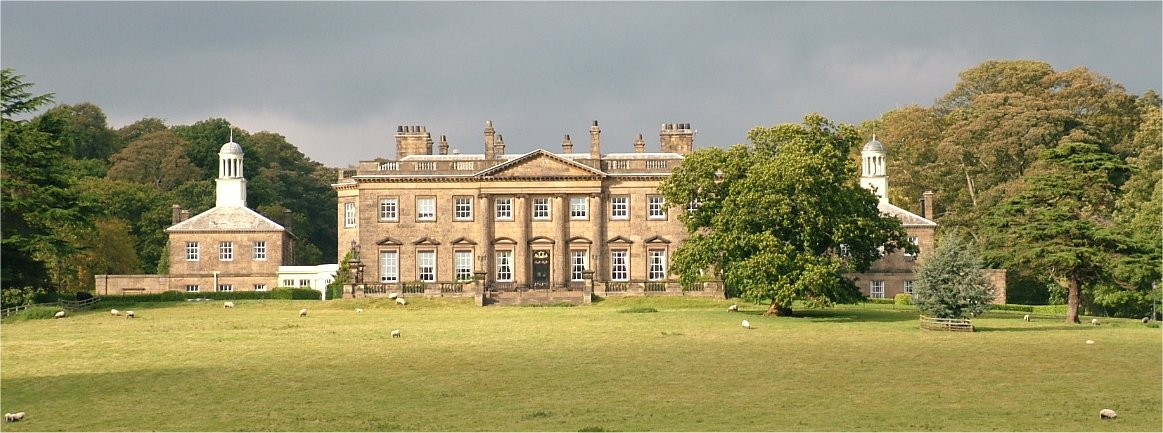
Denton Hall, the estate purchased by Lord Illingworth in 1920.

Lord Illingworth married firstly Annie Elizabeth, daughter of Isaac Holden Crothers, in 1895. They had no children and were divorced in 1926. He married secondly Margaret Mary Clare, daughter of William Basil Wilberforce, in 1931. This marriage was also childless.

From 1928 to his death, Illingworth leased a town house at 39/44 Grosvenor Square in Mayfair. His widow remained at Grosvenor Square until 1966.

Illingworth died in January 1942, aged 76, when the barony became extinct. His second wife died in 1986, having become before her death the victim of a massive defrauding of her estate by her niece who had been investigated over the murder of Simon Dale, the latter's ex-husband.

Parliament of the United Kingdom
Preceded by Harold Cawley	Member of Parliament for Heywood; 1915–1918	Constituency abolished
New constituency	Member of Parliament for Heywood and Radcliffe; 1918–1921	Succeeded by Walter Halls
Political offices
Preceded by Jack Pease	Postmaster General; 1916–1921	Succeeded by F. G. Kellaway
Peerage of the United Kingdom
New creation	Baron Illingworth; 1921–1942	Extinct
