= George Kemp, 1st Baron Rochdale =

English cricketer

Colonel The Right Honourable The Lord Rochdale CB DL
- Born: George Kemp; 9 June 1866; Beechwood, Rochdale, Lancashire, England
- Died: 24 March 1945 (aged 78); Lingholm, Portinscale, Cumberland, England

George Kemp, 1st Baron Rochdale, CB, DL (9 June 1866 – 24 March 1945) was a British politician, soldier, businessman and cricketer.

== Education and business career ==
Kemp was born at Beechwood, Rochdale, Lancashire, and educated at Shrewsbury and Mill Hill Schools. Matriculating at Balliol College, Oxford, in 1883, aged 16, Kemp transferred to Trinity College, Cambridge, in 1884, where he graduated B.A. in the Classical Tripos in 1888. In business, Kemp went into the woollen industry eventually becoming Chairman of Kelsall & Kemp, flannel manufacturers.

== Cricket ==
From 1885 to 1892, Kemp played first-class cricket for Lancashire and Cambridge University. A batsman, he scored three centuries all against Yorkshire - 109 in the Roses Match, at Huddersfield, in 1885 whilst still a teenager and 125 and 103 within 18 days of each other in 1886 at Fenner's and Sheffield respectively. While at Shrewsbury School he appeared in one county cricket match for Shropshire. He was also, at university, a lawn tennis 'Blue'.

== Politics ==
In 1895, he was elected Member of Parliament (MP) for Heywood as Liberal Unionist. He served as Parliamentary Private Secretary to William Ellison-Macartney, Parliamentary Secretary to the Admiralty, until January 1900, when he resigned to serve in the Second Boer War.

In 1904, along with Winston Churchill, Kemp was among a group of Conservative and Liberal Unionist Free Traders who crossed the floor to join the Liberals in response to Joseph Chamberlain's Tariff reform policies. In 1909, he was knighted for his war services and at the January 1910 general election he was elected MP for Manchester North West, this time as a Liberal. Kemp found himself increasingly out of step with the actions of the Liberal government. He was opposed to the Liberal Chancellor of the Exchequer Lloyd George's financial policies. He also opposed Lloyd George's advocacy of Welsh disestablishment. His long-standing opposition to Irish Home Rule had not diminished and he opposed the Liberal Government's Irish Home Rule bill. As he still felt out of step with the Unionist's advocacy of Tariff Reform, he decided to retire from the House of Commons. He declared that he "loathed politics".

A year later he was raised to the peerage as Baron Rochdale, of Rochdale in the County Palatine of Lancaster.

== Military career ==
Kemp had been a captain of the Duke of Lancaster's Own Yeomanry since July 1891. In early February 1900, Kemp volunteered for active service in South Africa during the Second Boer War. He was appointed a captain of the Imperial Yeomanry, in command of the 23rd company (the Yeomanry detachment of the Duke of Lancaster's Own Yeomanry), to serve as part of the 8th Battalion Imperial Yeomanry. His company left Liverpool on the SS Africa on 12 February, and arrived in Cape Town the following month. For his service he was mentioned in despatches. He left again for South Africa in May 1902, as temporary lieutenant-colonel in command of the 32nd Battalion of the Imperial Yeomanry, including a machine-gun section which he had helped raise.

The battalion arrived shortly after the war ended by the Treaty of Vereeniging on 31 May 1902, and never saw any fighting. Kemp obtained leave to return home before his regiment, and left Cape Town on the SS Kildonan Castle in late September 1902, arriving at Southampton the following month.

He relinquished his commission with the Imperial Yeomanry and was granted the honorary rank of Lieutenant-Colonel in the Army on 12 October 1902.

Called to war again in 1914, Lord Rochdale was Lieutenant-Colonel in command the 1st/6th Battalion, Lancashire Fusiliers, part of 125th (1/1st Lancashire Fusiliers) Brigade, and was temporarily brigadier general of 127th (1/1st Manchester) Brigade of the 42nd (East Lancashire) Division during the Battle of Gallipoli in 1915. He was promoted to lieutenant colonel in August 1916 and honorary colonel in May 1923.

== Family ==
Kemp married, on 5 August 1896, Lady Beatrice Mary Egerton (1871–1966), third daughter of Francis Egerton, 3rd Earl of Ellesmere. Lady Beatrice Kemp joined her husband in South Africa in early 1900.

They had three children. Lord Rochdale died at Lingholm near Keswick, Cumberland in 1945, aged 88, and was succeeded by his eldest son, John.

== Arms ==
Coat of arms of George Kemp, 1st Baron Rochdale
Coronet A Coronet of a Viscount Crest A cubit arm erect vested Argent cuffed Azure the hand Proper grasping a chaplet Vert encircling a rose as in the arms. Escutcheon Argent a chevron engrailed Gules between two estoiles in chief Azure and a rose of the second in base barbed and seeded Proper. Supporters On either side a ram Or charged on the shoulder with a rose Gules slipped and leaved Proper. Motto Lucem Spero (I Hope For Light)

Parliament of the United Kingdom
Preceded by Thomas Snape	Member of Parliament for Heywood; 1895–1906	Succeeded by Edward Holden
Preceded by William Joynson-Hicks	Member of Parliament for Manchester North West; Jan. 1910–1912	Succeeded by Sir John Randles
Honorary titles
Preceded by The Lord Revelstoke	Lord Lieutenant of Middlesex; 1929–1945	Succeeded by The Lord Latham
Peerage of the United Kingdom
New creation	Baron Rochdale; 1913–1945	Succeeded by John Durival Kemp
