= 1915 Heywood by-election =

UK Parliamentary by-election

Harold Thomas Cawley

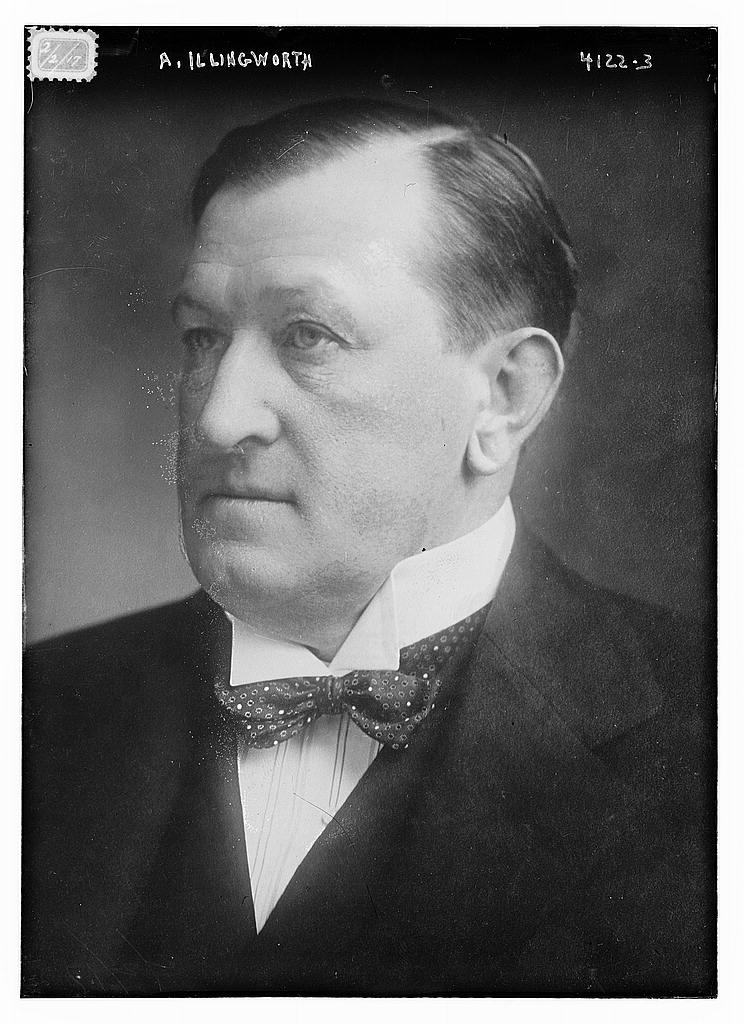
Albert Illingworth

The 1915 Heywood by-election was held in England on 10 November 1915. The by-election was held due to the incumbent Liberal MP, Harold Thomas Cawley, being killed in the Battle of Gallipoli. It was won by the Liberal candidate Albert Illingworth, who was unopposed due to a War-time electoral pact.
