= Thomas Snape =

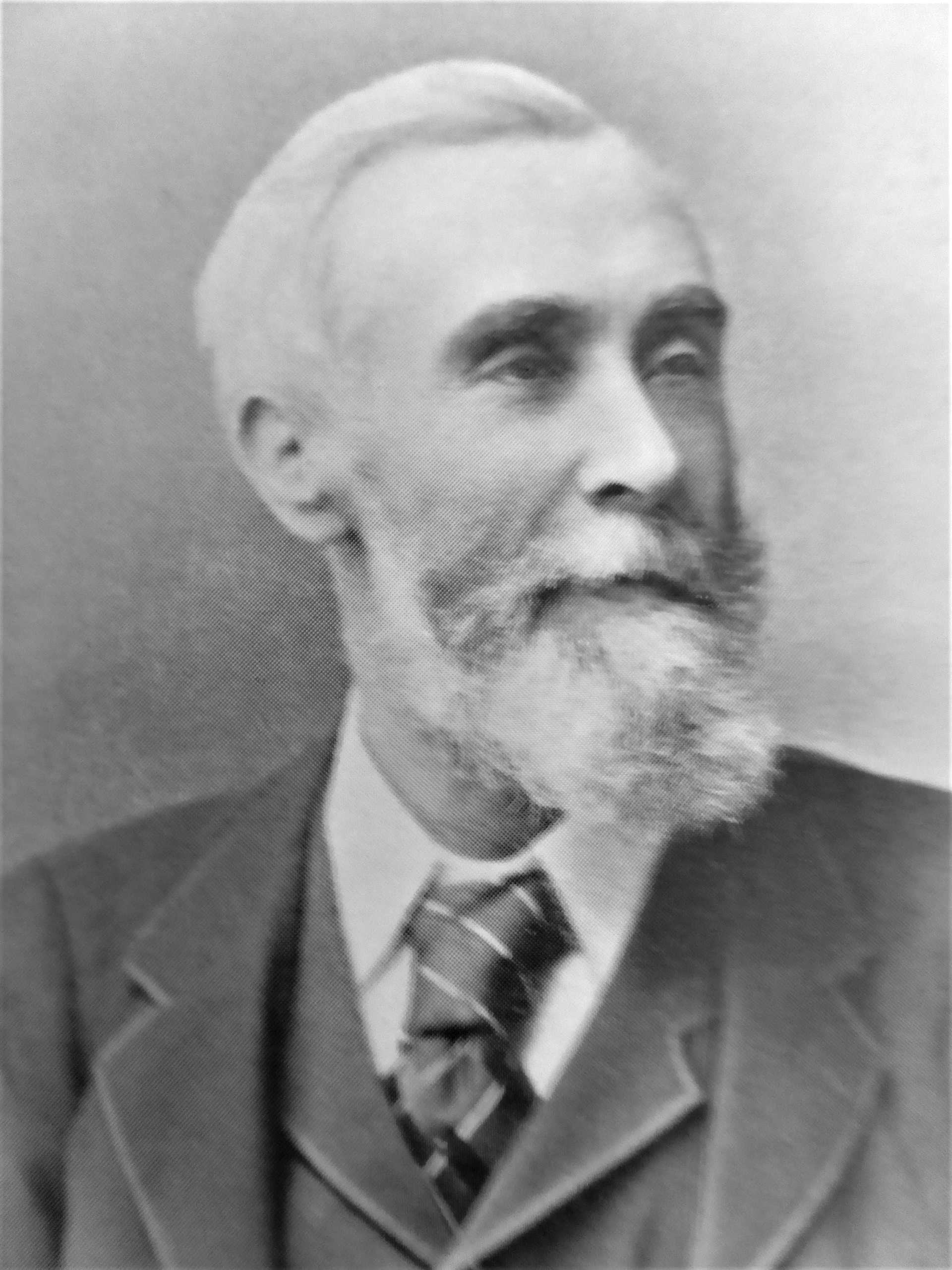
- Thomas Snape, c.1899

Member of Parliament for Heywood
- In office 1892-1895
- Preceded by: Isaac Hoyle
- Succeeded by: George Kemp, 1st Baron Rochdale
- Majority: 621 (7.6%)

Personal details
- Born: 1835 Salford
- Died: 9 August 1912 (aged 76–77) Liverpool
- Party: Liberal Party
- Children: Henry Lloyd Snape

Religious life
- Religion: Christianity
- Denomination: United Methodist Free Church

Thomas Snape (1835 – 9 August 1912) was a British industrialist and Liberal politician.

Snape was born in Salford, and was initially employed by John Hutchinson and Sons, a company that pioneered the use of the Leblanc process to produce soda ash, and led to the creation of a large chemical industry in Widnes, Lancashire. He subsequently established his own business, T. Snape and Company, with its works in the town. In 1890 Snape's became a constituent part of the United Alkali Company.

Snape was a prominent member of the Methodist Free Church and a supporter of the temperance and peace movements. He was a long-time member of the Liverpool Peace Society and served as its president in 1895. He stood as Liberal candidate for parliament on a number of occasions, but was only successful at the 1892 general election, when he became MP for Heywood. He lost his seat three years later to George Kemp of the Conservatives.

Although no longer in parliament, Snape continued his involvement with politics. At the time of his death he was a county alderman on Lancashire County Council, and a justice of the peace for the county.

Thomas Snape died at his residence in Liverpool in 1912, aged 77.

== Family ==
Snape was the father of Henry Lloyd Snape, known for being professor of Chemistry at University of Wales, Aberystwyth and later director of education at Lancashire County Council.

Parliament of the United Kingdom
Preceded by Isaac Hoyle	Member for Heywood; 1892–1895	Succeeded by George Kemp
