= Lingholm =

Country house in England

Coordinates: 54°35′23.99″N 3°9′22.58″W

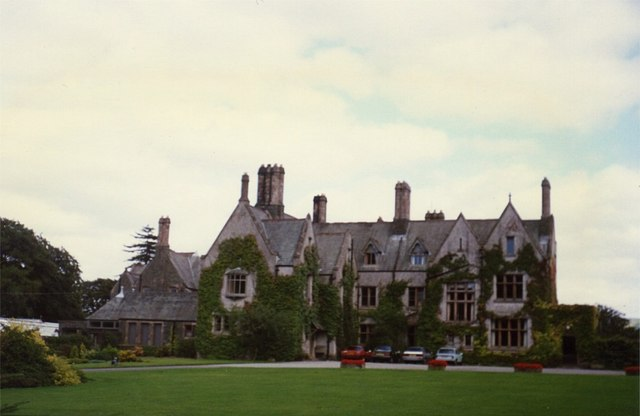
Lingholm in 1987

Lingholm is a country house just outside Portinscale in Cumbria, England.

== History ==
The house was built in 1871–1875 for Lt. Col. James Fenton Greenall (1834–1899), of the Greenall brewing family, Commanding Officer of the 9th Lancashire Rifle Volunteers, at a cost of £15,700 by Alfred Waterhouse. In 1900, it was purchased by the family of George Kemp, 1st Baron Rochdale. They commissioned Bertram Symons-Jeune to design the water garden at Lingholm. Between 1885 and 1907, Beatrix Potter spent her summer holidays at Lingholm, where she wrote some of her best-known stories. Beatrix credited the Lingholm Kitchen Garden as her original inspiration for Mr McGregor's Garden in The Tale of Peter Rabbit. She also wrote The Tale of Squirrel Nutkin and the first draft of The Tale of Mrs Tiggy-Winkle whilst staying at Lingholm.

During World War I, the house was used as a hospital for wounded officers.

As a result of Beatrix Potter's connection and its unique design by a well respected architect, Lingholm was listed Grade II on the National Heritage List for England in 2013.
