= Heywood (constituency) =

Parliamentary constituency in the United Kingdom, 1885–1918

- Former county constituency for the House of Commons

1885–1918
- Seats: one
- Created from: South East Lancashire
- Replaced by: Heywood and Radcliffe

Heywood was a county constituency in the county of Lancashire of the House of Commons for the Parliament of the United Kingdom which existed between 1885 and 1918. Created by the Redistribution of Seats Act 1885, it was represented by one Member of Parliament. The constituency was abolished in 1918.

The 2023 review of Westminster constituencies proposes to re-establish the seat in its revised proposal.

== Boundaries and History ==
This area had previously been represented as part of the South East Lancashire multi-seat division. The Redistribution of Seats Act 1885 divided the former constituency into eight new single-member seats, one of which was designated South-East Lancashire, Heywood Division.

The constituency comprised the Municipal Borough of Heywood, the cotton town of Ramsbottom, and a number of surrounding townships, namely: Ainsworth, Ashworth, Pilkington, Tottington Higher End and the rural part of the parish of Spotland.

The constituency was mostly industrial but it included some agriculture. The town of Heywood was the most Liberal part of the constituency, having an engineering-based economy; Ramsbottom was more marginal politically. The countryside element of the constituency was Conservative inclined. Overall the division was Liberal 1885–1895, Liberal Unionist 1895–1904 and after a change of allegiance by the sitting MP was Liberal again from 1904 until the constituency was abolished in 1918.

The constituency adjoined Westhoughton to the west, Rossendale to the north, Middleton and Rochdale to the east as well as Radcliffe-cum-Farnworth, Bury, and another part of the Middleton constituency to the south.

The Representation of the People Act 1918 abolished this constituency. The successor seat was Heywood and Radcliffe.

== Members of Parliament ==
Election	Member	Party
1885	Isaac Hoyle	Liberal
1892	Thomas Snape	Liberal
1895	George Kemp	Liberal Unionist
1904	George Kemp	Liberal
1906	Sir Edward Holden, Bt	Liberal
Jan 1910	Harold Cawley	Liberal
1915 by-election	Albert Illingworth	Liberal
1916	Albert Illingworth	Coalition Liberal
1918	Constituency abolished: see Heywood and Radcliffe	

== Elections ==
=== Elections in the 1880s ===
Kenyon

General election 1885: Heywood
Party	Candidate	Votes	%
Liberal	Isaac Hoyle	4,538	53.4
Conservative	James Kenyon	3,955	46.6
Majority		583	6.8
Turnout		8,493	91.6
Registered electors		9,269	
Liberal win (new seat)			

Lawson

General election 1886: Heywood
Party	Candidate	Votes	%	±%
Liberal	Isaac Hoyle	4,206	52.8	−0.6
Conservative	John Lawson	3,762	47.2	+0.6
Majority		444	5.6	−1.2
Turnout		7,968	86.0	−5.6
Registered electors		9,269		
Liberal hold		Swing	-0.6	

=== Elections in the 1890s ===
General election 1892: Heywood
Party	Candidate	Votes	%	±%
Liberal	Thomas Snape	4,366	53.8	+1.0
Liberal Unionist	Sir Henry Hayes Lawrence, 2nd Baronet	3,745	46.2	−1.0
Majority		621	7.6	+2.0
Turnout		8,111	87.7	+1.7
Registered electors		9,251		
Liberal hold		Swing	+1.0	

Kemp

General election 1895: Heywood
Party	Candidate	Votes	%	±%
Liberal Unionist	George Kemp	4,489	53.3	+7.1
Liberal	Thomas Snape	3,933	46.7	−7.1
Majority		556	6.6	N/A
Turnout		8,422	90.2	+2.5
Registered electors		9,334		
Liberal Unionist gain from Liberal		Swing	+7.1	

=== Elections in the 1900s ===
General election 1900: Heywood
Party	Candidate	Votes	%	±%
Liberal Unionist	George Kemp	4,657	51.2	−2.1
Liberal	Edward Holden	4,431	48.8	+2.1
Majority		226	2.4	−4.2
Turnout		9,088	90.7	+0.5
Registered electors		10,022		
Liberal Unionist hold		Swing	-2.1	

Holden

General election 1906: Heywood
Party	Candidate	Votes	%	±%
Liberal	Edward Holden	5,351	55.8	+7.0
Liberal Unionist	Mervyn Manningham-Buller	4,245	44.2	−7.0
Majority		1,106	11.6	N/A
Turnout		9,596	91.7	+1.0
Registered electors		10,463		
Liberal gain from Liberal Unionist		Swing	+7.0	

=== Elections in the 1910s ===
Cawley

General election January 1910: Heywood
Party	Candidate	Votes	%	±%
Liberal	Harold Cawley	5,809	55.0	−0.8
Conservative	Mervyn Manningham-Buller	4,750	45.0	+0.8
Majority		1,059	10.0	−1.6
Turnout		10,559	93.1	+1.4
Liberal hold		Swing	-0.8	

General election December 1910: Heywood
Party	Candidate	Votes	%	±%
Liberal	Harold Cawley	5,430	53.9	−1.1
Conservative	Robert A L Hutchinson	4,641	46.1	+1.1
Majority		789	7.8	−2.2
Turnout		10,071	88.8	−4.3
Liberal hold		Swing	-1.1	

General Election 1914–15:

Another General Election was required to take place before the end of 1915. The political parties had been making preparations for an election to take place and by the July 1914, the following candidates had been selected;

- Liberal: Harold Cawley
- Unionist: Thomas Fermor-Hesketh

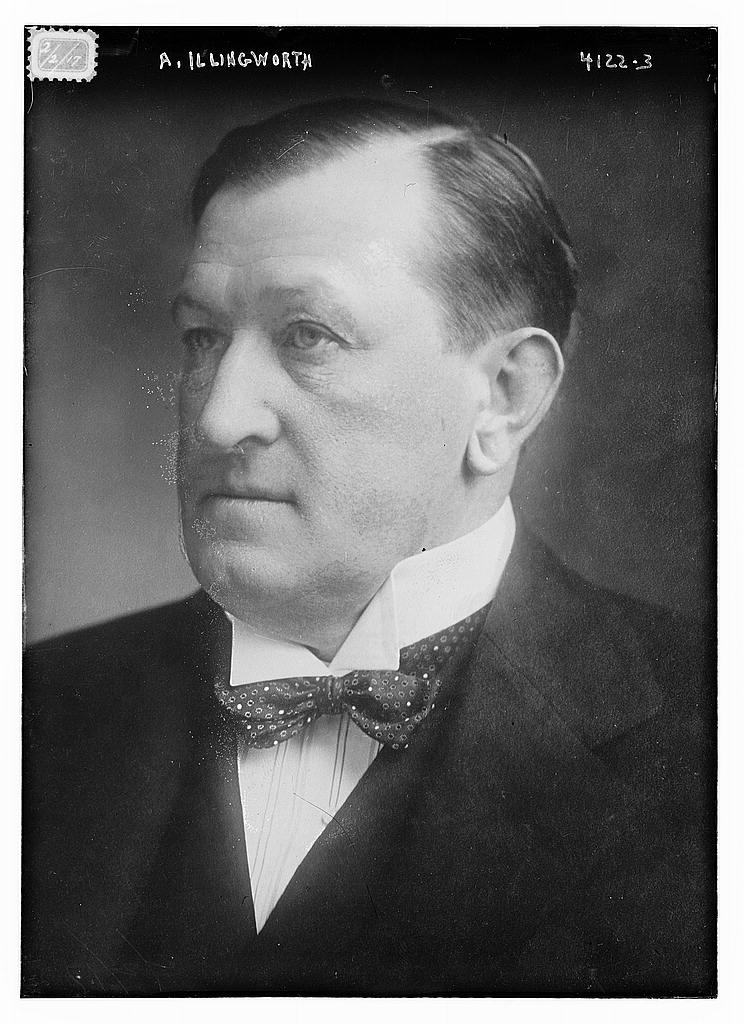
Illingworth

1915 Heywood by-election
Party	Candidate	Votes	%	±%
Liberal	Albert Illingworth	Unopposed		
Liberal hold				

== Sources ==
- Leigh Rayment's Historical List of MPs – Constituencies beginning with "H" (part 3)
- Boundaries of Parliamentary Constituencies 1885–1972, compiled and edited by F.W.S. Craig (Parliamentary Reference Publications 1972)
- British Parliamentary Election Results 1885–1918, compiled and edited by F.W.S. Craig (Macmillan Press 1974)
- Social Geography of British Elections 1885–1910. by Henry Pelling (Macmillan 1967)
- Who's Who of British Members of Parliament, Volume II 1886–1918, edited by M. Stenton and S. Lees (Harvester Press 1978)
- Who's Who of British Members of Parliament, Volume III 1919–1945, edited by M. Stenton and S. Lees (Harvester Press 1979)
