= Larry Irving =

American lawyer

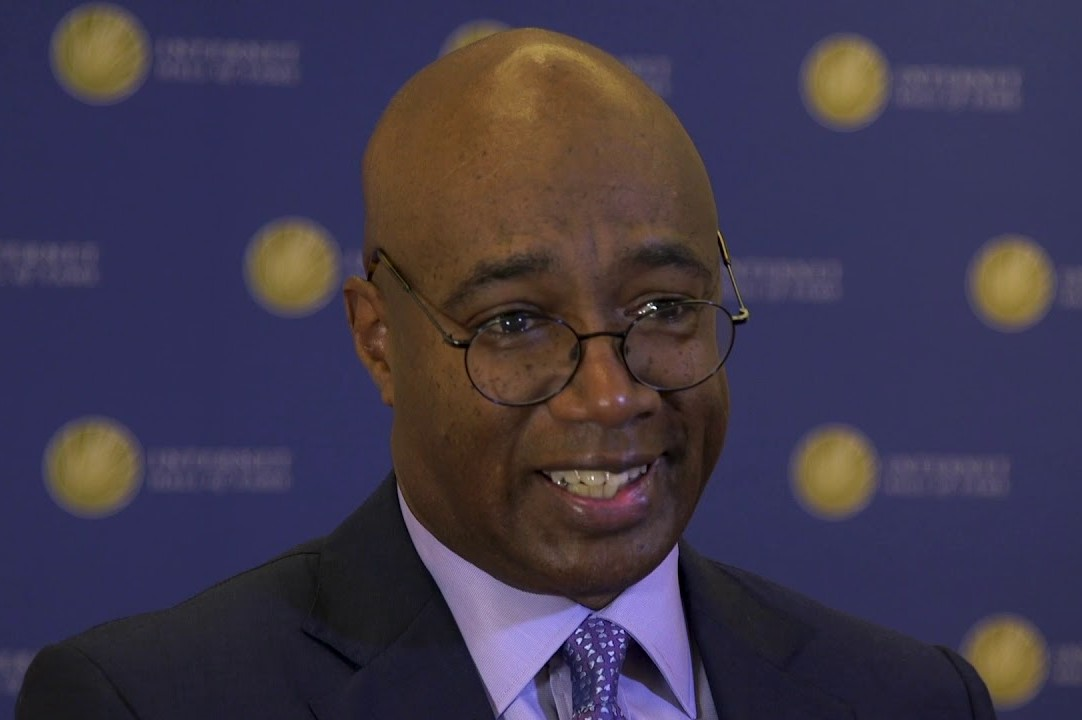
- Irving in 2019

Personal details
- Born: Clarence Irving Jr. July 7, 1955 (age 70) New York City, New York, U.S.
- Party: Democratic
- Education: Northwestern University (BA); Stanford University (JD)

Clarence "Larry" Irving Jr. (born July 7, 1955) is an American lawyer who is the former Vice President of Global Government Affairs for Hewlett-Packard Company. He joined the company on September 9, 2009, and left in 2011.

== Career ==
Irving is president and CEO of the Irving Information Group, a telecommunication and information technology strategic planning and consulting business based in Washington, D.C. Irving launched his business in October 1999. Prior to starting his business, he was head of the National Telecommunications Infrastructure Administration (NTIA), an agency of the United States Department of Commerce that serves as the President's principal adviser on telecommunications policies pertaining to the United States' economic and technological advancement and to regulation of the telecommunications industry. He was a principal architect of President Bill Clinton's telecommunications, Internet and e-commerce policies and initiatives and acted as a senior adviser to the President and to Vice President Al Gore and the United States Secretary of Commerce during his tenure from 1993 to 1999. Irving was a member of the Clinton-Gore transition team focusing on telecommunications issues. More recently, he worked with President Barack Obama's transition team on science and tech agencies.

== Prior offices ==
Before becoming head of NTIA, Irving was a Senior Counsel for the U.S. House of Representatives, Subcommittee on Telecommunications and Finance. While working for the committee, he helped draft and negotiate the Cable Television Consumer Protection Act, the Children's Television Act and Television Decoder Circuitry Act.

He has also served as Legislative Director and Counsel for U.S. congressman Mickey Leland, a Democrat from the 18th District in Texas. Irving was active with the Congressional Black Caucus while Leland was its chair. He was an Associate with the law firm Hogan and Hartson, the oldest major law firm headquartered in Washington, D.C.

== Published reports ==
While serving the NTIA, Irving authored three reports entitled "Falling Through the Net" that highlighted the scope and the consequences of inequities in access to information technology. He helped define the scope of and bring to public attention to the digital divide, a term referring to the gap between people with effective access to digital and information technology and those with very limited or no access at all.

== Other activities and honors ==
He also sits on the board in an official or adviser capacity for a variety of organizations, including Internews, ReliabilityFirst Corporation, Waggener Edstrom, the Education Development Center, Annenberg School of the University of Southern California, Stanford Law School and the Weinberg College of Arts and Sciences of Northwestern University. He was named one of the 50 most influential persons in the "Year of the Internet" by Newsweek magazine in 1994. In 2019, he was inducted into the Internet Hall of Fame.

== Education ==
Irving is a 1976 B.A. graduate of Northwestern University in Chicago, Illinois, and holds the degree of J.D. from Stanford University in Stanford, California, where he was class president.
