= Piccadilly Gardens =

Public park in Manchester, England

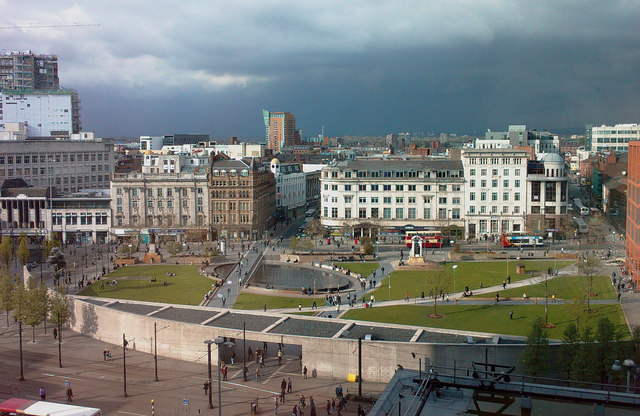
- Aerial view of Piccadilly Gardens
- Interactive map of Piccadilly Gardens
- Maintained by: City of Manchester
- Addresses: One Piccadilly Gardens; City Tower, Manchester; Watts Warehouse
- Location: Greater Manchester, England
- Nearest metro station: Piccadilly Gardens tram stop
- Coordinates: 53°28′52″N 02°14′14″W
- North: Piccadilly
- East: Portland Street
- South: Parker Street
- West: Mosley Street

Construction
- Completed: 1854 (172 years ago)

Other
- Designer: EDAW/Arup (2003 redesign)

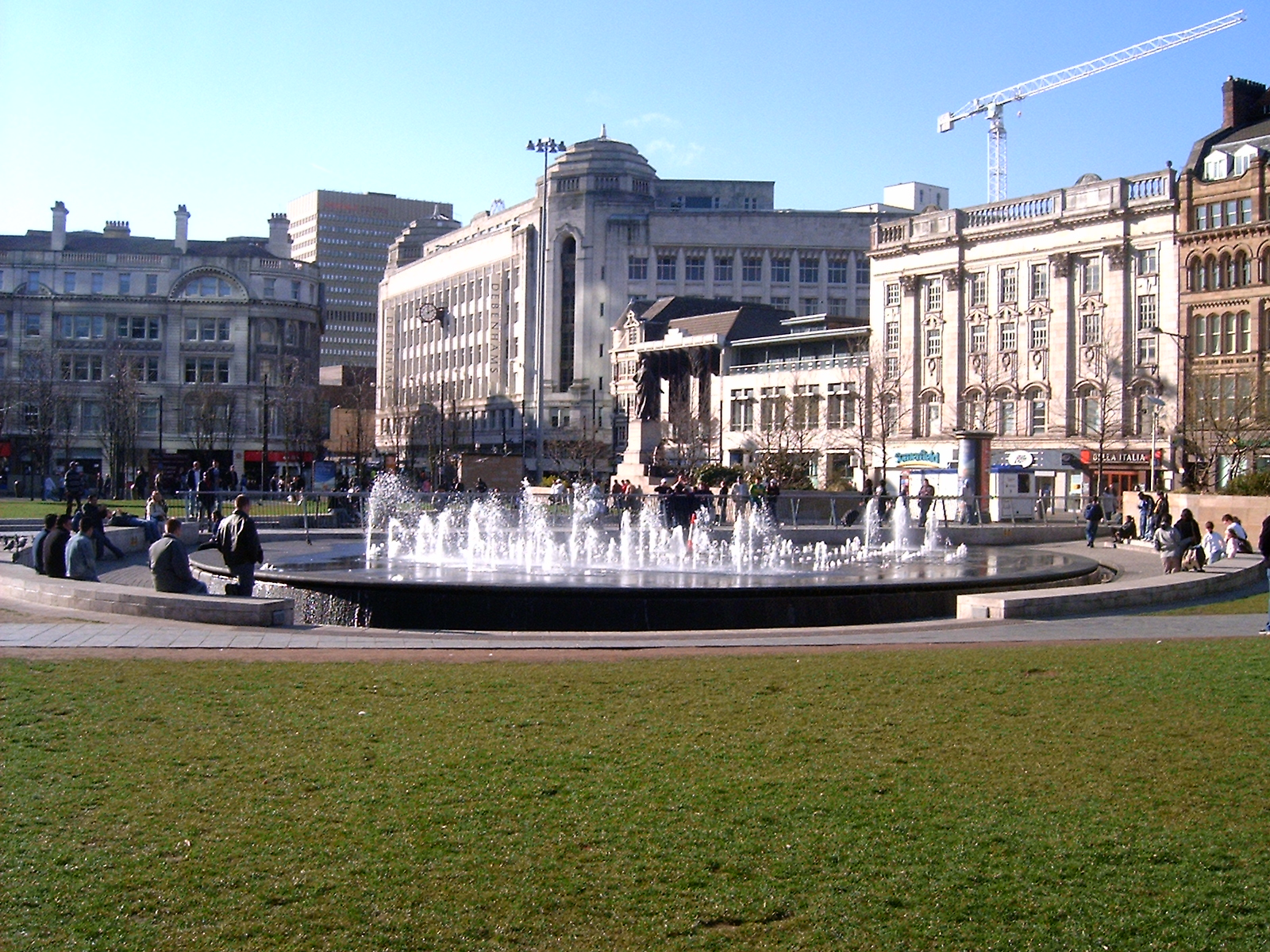
Piccadilly Gardens

Piccadilly Gardens is a green space in Manchester city centre, England, on the edge of the Northern Quarter.

It takes its name from the adjacent street, Piccadilly, which runs across the city centre from Market Street to London Road. The gardens also contain a bus station and a tram stop. The nearby Piccadilly railway station is the main entry point for people arriving in the city.

The gardens were laid out after World War I, on the former site of the Manchester Royal Infirmary. Originally landscaped as an ornamental sunken garden, the area was levelled out and reconfigured in 2002 with a water feature and concrete pavilion by Japanese architect Tadao Ando.

== History ==
Before 1755, the area was occupied by water-filled clay pits called the Daub Holes. The street running along the northern edge was then called Lever's Row, later renamed Piccadilly. In the 18th century, Sir Oswald Mosley, 2nd Baronet, of Rolleston, Lord of the manor of Manchester, donated the land to the city on condition that it should remain in public use in perpetuity, on pain of the land reverting to the Mosley family.

=== Manchester Royal Infirmary ===
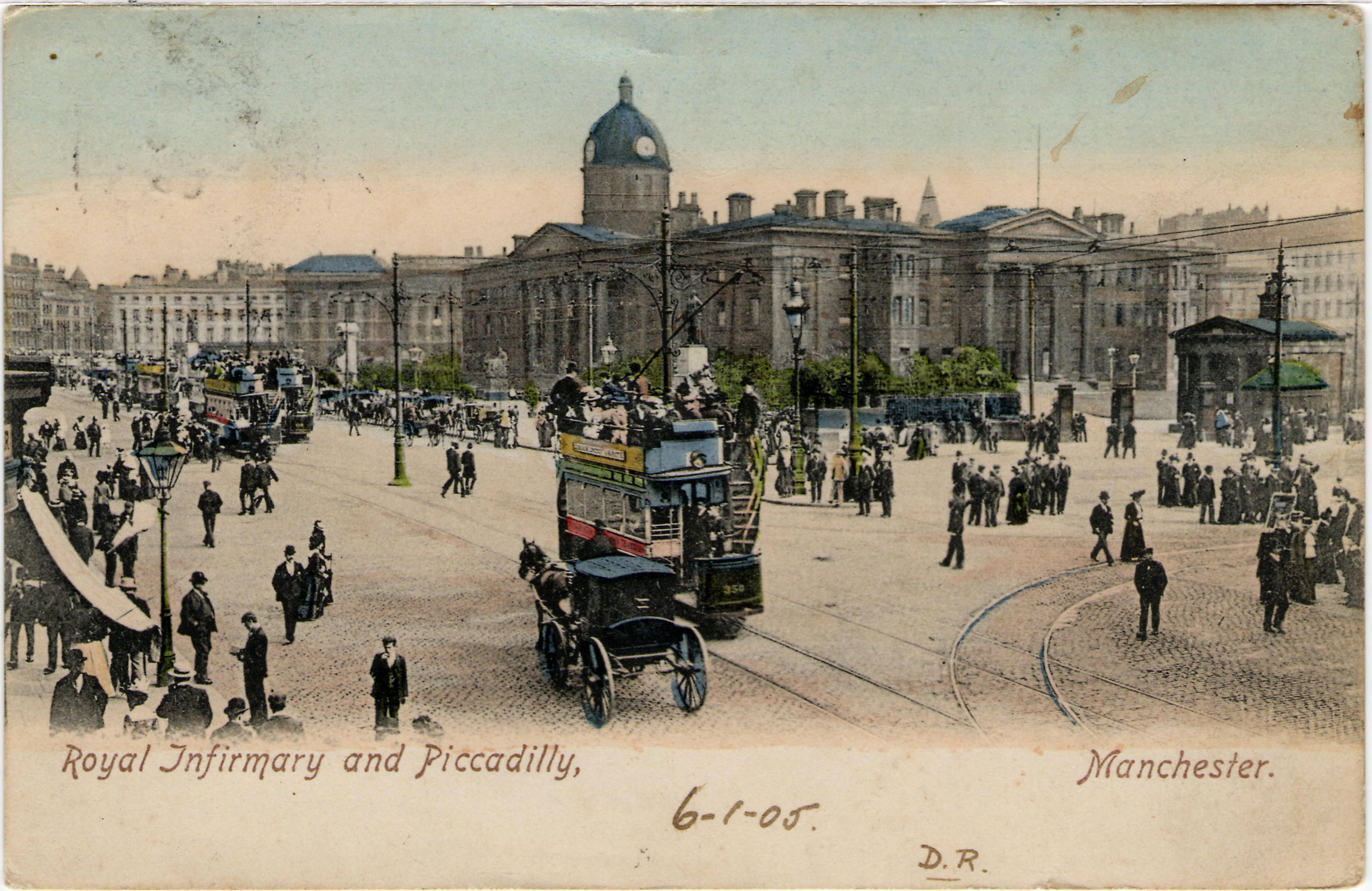
The Royal Infirmary on Piccadilly in 1905

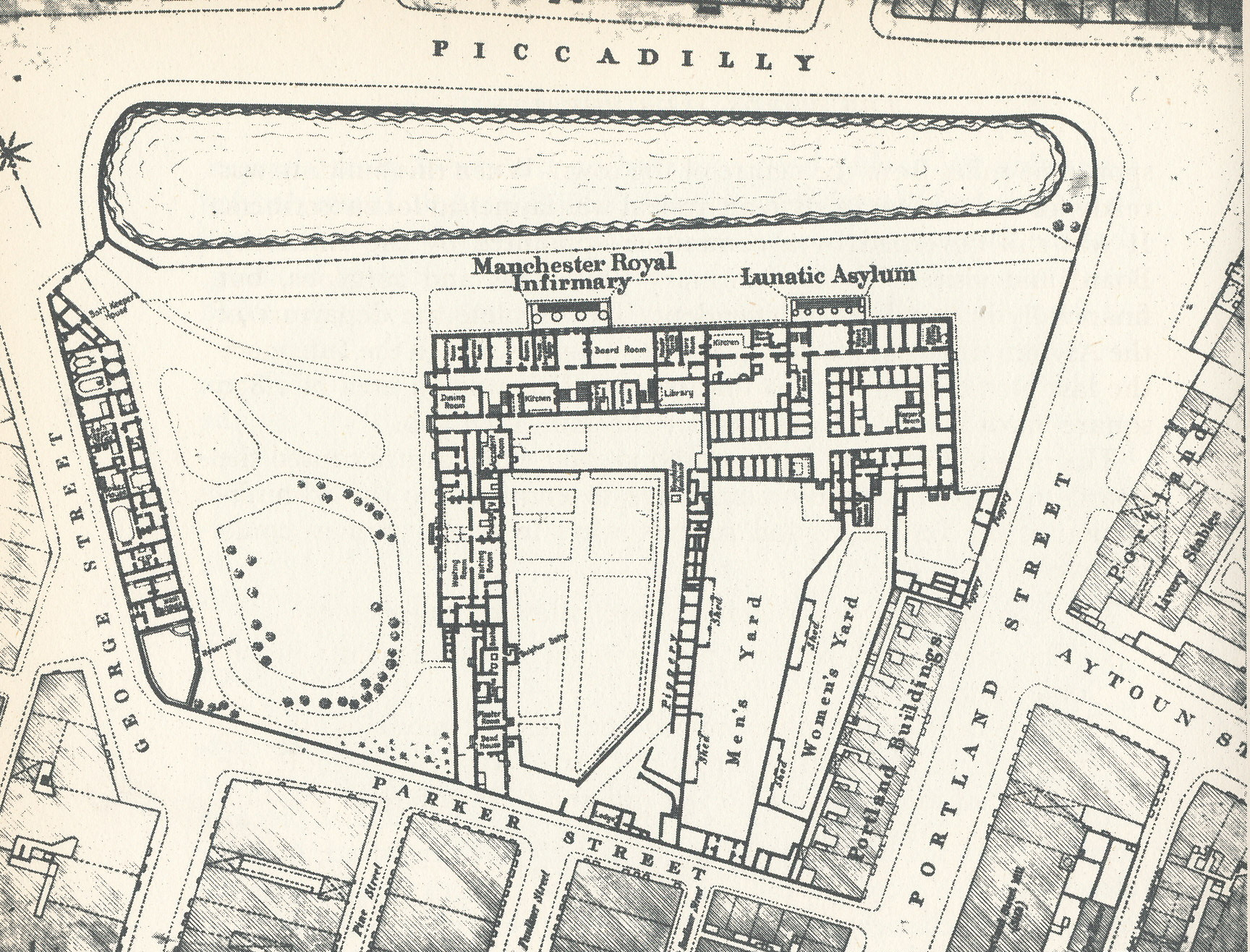
1845 map of the Royal Infirmary on Piccadilly

In 1755, with the assent of Sir Oswald Mosley, the Manchester Royal Infirmary was built here. In 1763, the Manchester Royal Lunatic Asylum was built next to the infirmary; this later moved to Cheadle in 1849 and is now Cheadle Royal Hospital.

In 1854, the area was laid out by the Manchester Corporation as a public esplanade, designed by Sir Joseph Paxton. The Daub Holes were turned into a fine ornamental fountain. Statues of noted figures such as the Duke of Wellington, Sir Robert Peel and John Dalton were laid out along the esplanade. Perrin's Manchester Handbook of 1857 wrote of the newly inaugurated space:

The open space in front of the infirmary, formerly occupied by a pond of water, has lately been given up to the corporation, and has by them been laid out as a public walk, with fountains, which were first displayed at the inauguration of the Wellington Statue on the 30th of August 1856.

— Joseph Perrin, Perrin's Manchester Handbook (1857)

In 1908, the infirmary relocated to its current site on Oxford Road. The hospital buildings were completely demolished by April 1910, apart from the outpatients department which continued to deal with minor injuries and dispense medication on this site until the 1930s.

The Manchester Public Free Library Reference Department was housed on the site for a number of years before the move to Manchester Central Library in 1934.

=== Landscaped gardens ===
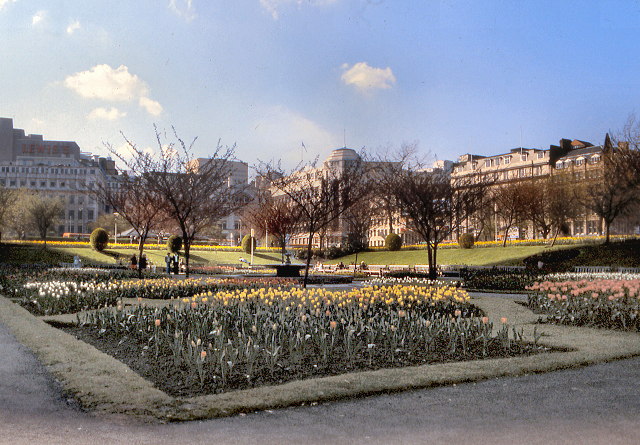
The sunken gardens in Piccadilly were laid out c.1930 (1979)

Following the demolition of the hospital, the use of the empty site was uncertain for some years. There was a proposal to erect a new municipal art gallery on the site and plans were drawn up by the architect Ernest Berry Webber for a large Neoclassical building. However, this scheme was never realised and the city's fine art collection remained in the Manchester City Art Gallery, on nearby Mosley Street. Another scheme put forward by the architect Richard Carpenter was to build a large new replacement for Manchester Cathedral on the site. In 1917, the conductor Thomas Beecham proposed the construction of a large opera house, but he went bankrupt before he could advance this plan any further. The "Great Hole of Piccadilly" remained empty throughout the 1910s and 1920s. In the 1930s, it was finally decided not to erect a new building on the former hospital site, but to turn it into a public garden. The area was landscaped and a sunken garden was laid out on the footprint of the former hospital basement, with formal flower beds, a rose garden and flowering cherry trees.

In the centre of the new gardens, the Corporation placed a bronze sculpture entitled Adrift, depicting a family clinging to a raft in a stormy sea. It was designed by the noted sculptor John Cassidy in 1907 and was given to the Manchester Corporation by the wealthy industrialist and art collector James Gresham, founder of Gresham and Craven engineering works. This was on the condition that the Corporation house it in the planned new art gallery. As the gallery scheme was not realised, Adrift was instead used as the centrepiece of the new sunken gardens. It remained there until 1953, when it was relocated to the south end of the gardens. It was replaced with a commemorative fountain to mark the Coronation of Queen Elizabeth II.

When the Salford painter L. S. Lowry created his 1954 oil painting Piccadilly Gardens, the Coronation Fountain is clearly visible in the centre of the view amid the sunken flower beds. The painting hangs in the City Art Gallery on Mosley Street.

=== 1945 plan ===
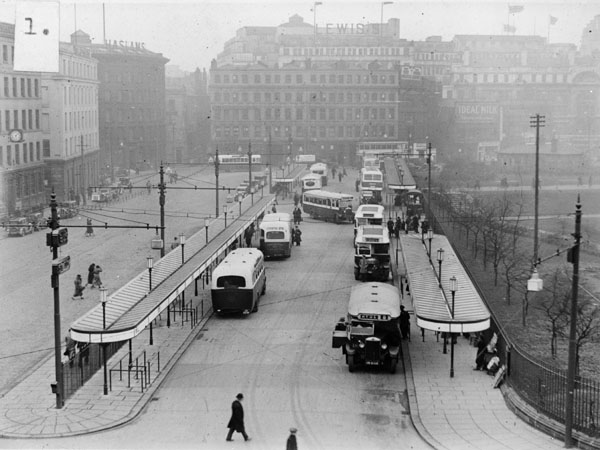
Parker Street bus station

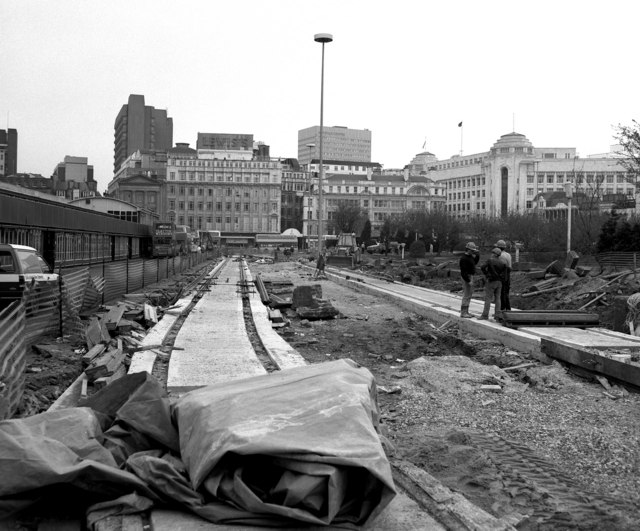
Laying tram tracks for the new Metrolink (1991)

During World War II, many warehouse buildings along Parker Street on the southern side of Piccadilly Gardens were destroyed by bombing during the Manchester Blitz. As part of the urban renewal in the aftermath of the war, The City of Manchester Plan was published by the City Corporation in 1945, which envisaged widespread redevelopment of the city centre. A "people’s place" entertainments centre was proposed for Piccadilly Gardens, encompassing a cinema, a theatre, dance halls, an ice-skating rink, a boxing stadium and restaurants; the surrounding gardens were to be floodlit. The plan was mostly unrealised.

Between 1959 and 1965, the empty bombsite on Parker Street was redeveloped and a complex of Modernist buildings was erected. These were collectively known as Piccadilly Plaza: the Piccadilly Hotel, Sunley House and Bernard House, designed by Covell, Matthews & Partners.

=== Transport interchanges ===
In 1931, as part of the redevelopment of the site, Parker Street bus station was opened on the south side of the gardens; it was extended in 1935. This provided a central transport interchange for bus passengers.

In 1991, construction work began on a new light rail transport network, Manchester Metrolink. New tram lines were laid along the southern and western sides of Piccadilly Gardens, and a new tram stop constructed.

=== 2000s redevelopment ===
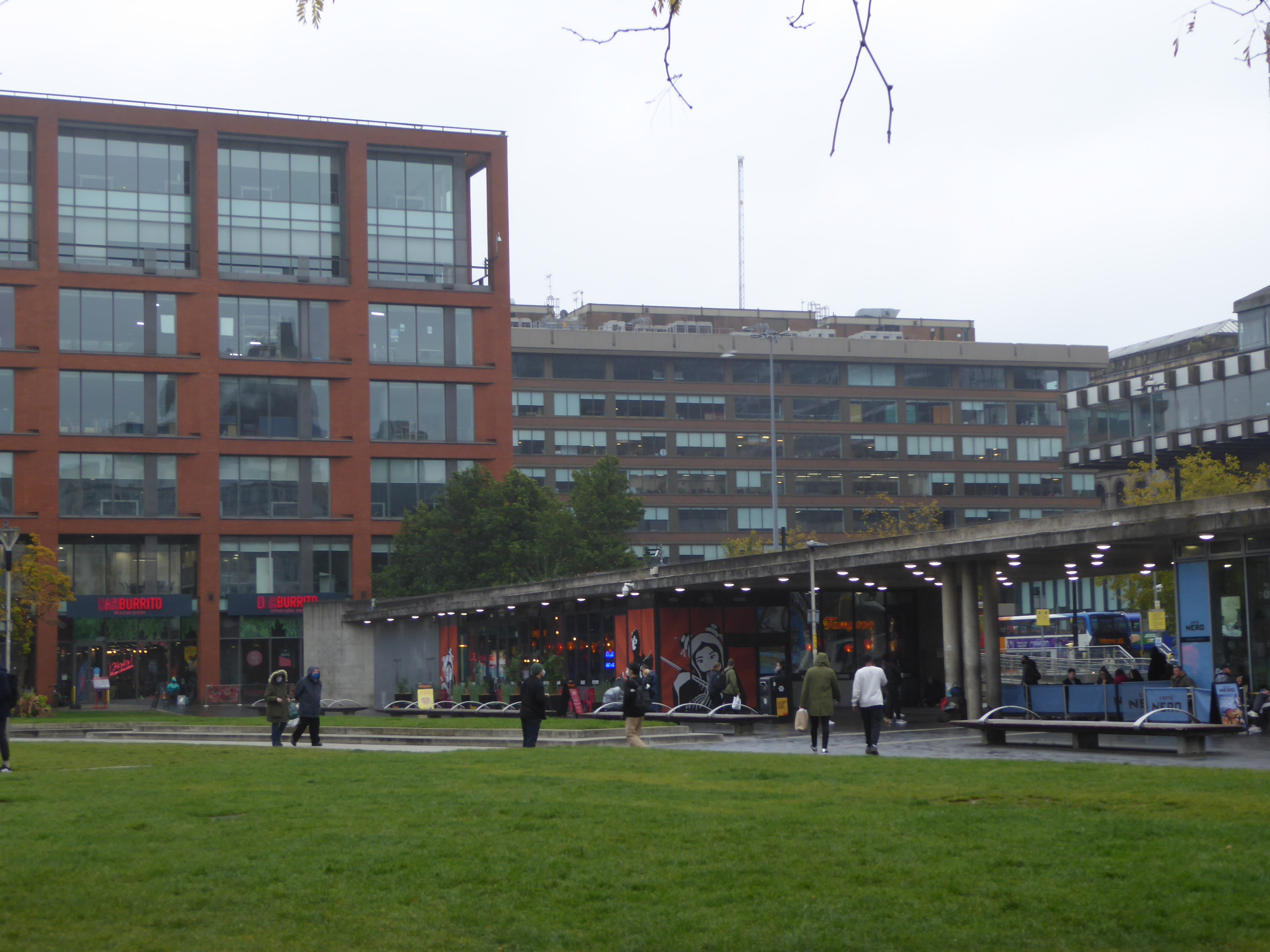
Ando's 2003 pavilion

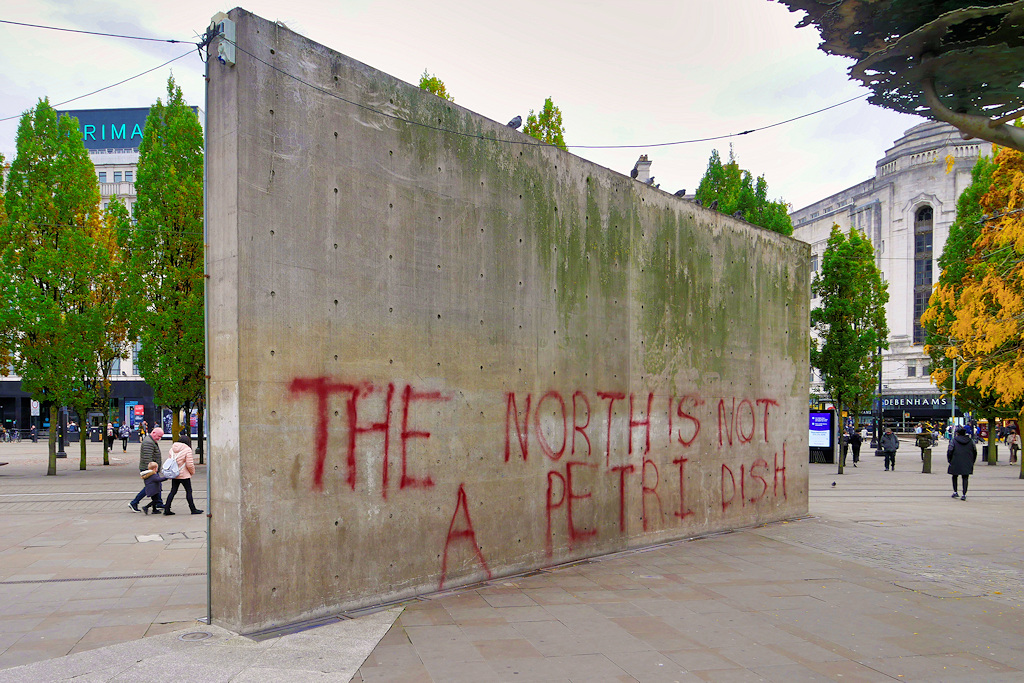
The concrete wall, sprayed with graffiti

By the 1990s, the sunken garden had fallen out of favour. It was considered by some to be an unwelcoming space, cut off from the main city activity; its secluded aspect attracted alcoholicsm, vagrants and drug users.

Following the 1996 Manchester bombing, an urban renewal programme was initiated across the city centre. Manchester City Council initiated an international competition for the redesign of Piccadilly Gardens; in 1998, the winners were announced from a shortlist of six. The landscape architects EDAW were the successful bidders, along with their design partners Arup, the Japanese architect Tadao Ando, local architects Chapman Robinson and lighting engineer Peter Fink.

Between 2001 and 2003, the gardens were redeveloped by EDAW, with aim of creating a "world class" public space for a twenty-four-hour city. The overall cost was £20.7 million. The 1930s sunken garden was removed and filled in to create a flat plane of lawns. New paths were laid along geometric lines and arcs, surfaced in sandstone and blue Welsh slate. At the centre, a large oval fountain plaza was installed, equipped with computer-controlled fountain jets. On the south side, adjacent to the tram and bus interchange, a new concrete modernist pavilion designed by Tadao Ando was erected along with a curved concrete wall to obscure the tram line. Selected species of trees were planted including London plane, fastigiated oak, flowering pear and magnolia. Most of the original statues were retained in situ.

A new seven-storey office building designed by Allies & Morrison, One Piccadilly Gardens, was erected on the eastern side of the gardens, reducing the size of the gardens by 11%. Its construction helped to fund the gardens redevelopment scheme.

The Piccadilly Gardens project was shortlisted in 2003 for the British Construction Industry Awards.

Problems subsequently emerged with the redesigned gardens. The grassed areas frequently become damaged and turn to mud after some public use; and must be re-turfed regularly. The design has been criticised for its "cold, modernistic" style. Tadao Ando's concrete partition wall has proved unpopular and has been likened to the Berlin Wall; it was partially removed in November 2020 in response to public comment – an action condemned by the Twentieth Century Society.

The Piccadilly Gardens area is frequently criticised as being a haven for drug users, and there have been media reports of spice being openly traded and consumed in public there.

=== 2020-present redevelopment ===
In response to ongoing problems with antisocial behaviour and the public response to the 2003 landscaping, Manchester City Council announced it would redevelop Piccadilly Gardens.

In 2020, Manchester City Council began working on changes to Piccadilly Gardens ahead of a wider redevelopment, including the partial demolition of the free-standing concrete wall along the northern edge of the gardens.

In 2021, the council launched a fresh urban design competition to redesign Piccadilly Gardens once again. The council has stated that the aim of the £25 million project will be to create a "world class" public space with a "uniquely Mancunian" identity.

In 2023, Manchester City Council announced that LDA Design will lead the redevelopment of Piccadilly Gardens, alongside Arup, United Creatives, Nayan Kulkarni, CPTED UK, The Liminal Space, Authentic Futures, and Gardiner & Theobald.

In 2024, further works took place with the upgrade of the Piccadilly Gardens Pavilion, including the removal of the roof structure connecting the two commercial units and the installation of a new lighting feature, as part of interim improvements to the site.

In 2025, Manchester City Council and LDA Designs revealed a new proposal for Piccadilly Gardens. The designs showed a more open and greener public space, with increased planting, the removal of the water feature and remaining concrete walls, changes to paths and seating. The plans include improvements to lighting and surveillance, including a permanent police presence, intended to improve safety within the Gardens.

The council said it had also been working on longer-term plans for Piccadilly Gardens and the wider area, including a multi-million pound investment by Transport for Greater Manchester (TfGM) to create a new transport interchange.

== Location ==
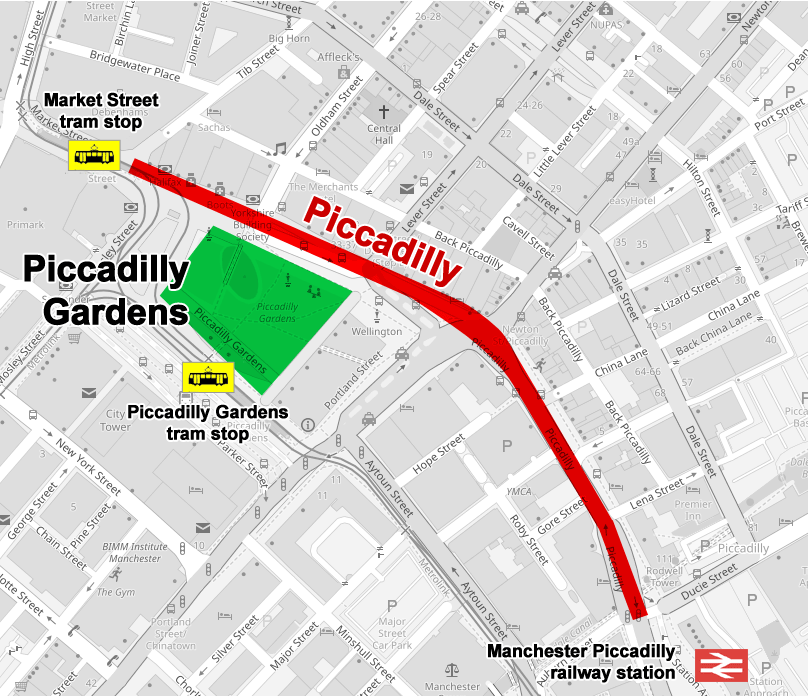
Map of Piccadilly Gardens, with the street Piccadilly highlighted in red

Piccadilly Gardens is located in Manchester city centre, just to the south of the Northern Quarter. The green space is bounded on four sides by streets: Mosley Street to the west, Parker Street to the south and Portland Street to the east; along the northern side is Piccadilly, a street that runs eastwards from the junction of Market Street to the junction of London Road with Ducie Street.

The name Piccadilly is often used to refer to the area around Piccadilly itself, including the gardens, Piccadilly station and Piccadilly Basin, a canal basin on the Rochdale Canal. Since 2018, the name has also been given to the electoral ward, Piccadilly.

== Transport ==
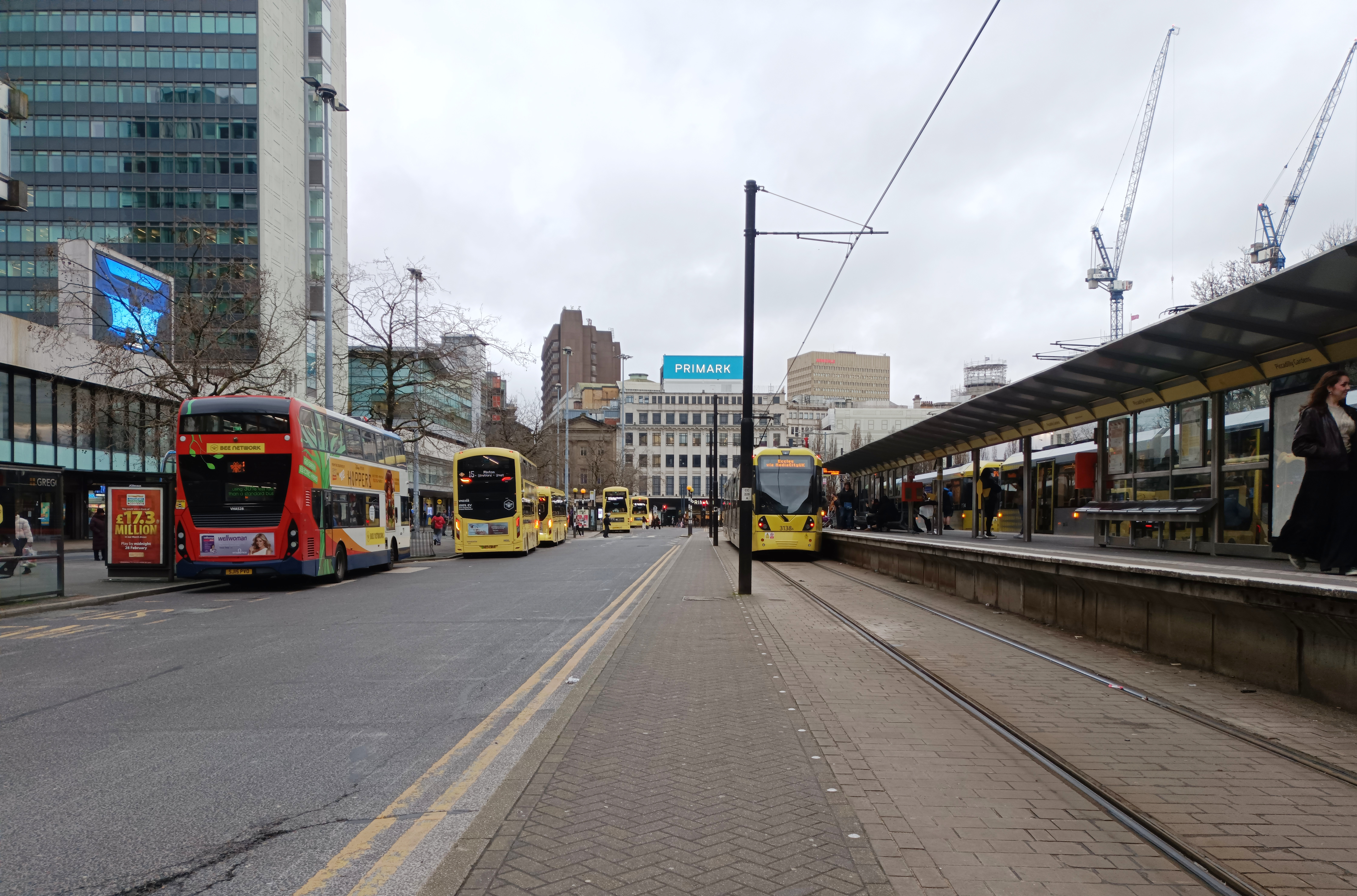
The bus station and tram stop

Piccadilly Gardens is a major transport hub on the Transport for Greater Manchester public transport network, providing interchange between bus and tram services:

- Manchester Piccadilly Gardens bus station (originally Parker Street bus station) is located on the south side of the gardens; it is served by a large number of bus routes serving destinations across Greater Manchester and beyond.
- Piccadilly Gardens tram stop is situated immediately adjacent to the bus station and is served by frequent Metrolink trams running to Bury, Eccles, MediaCityUK and Altrincham via Piccadilly.
- Market Street tram stop is located nearby on Market Street to the north and is served by trams to and from Victoria station.
- Manchester Piccadilly railway station, located approximately 0.3 miles (0.5 km) away, is the nearest National Rail main line station; it is served by suburban and inter-city trains.

== Buildings and monuments ==
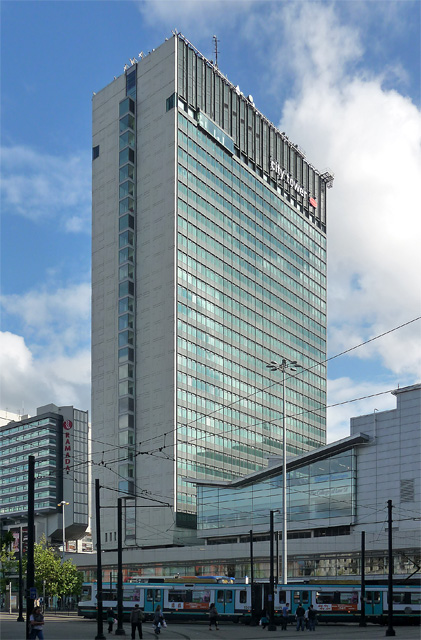
City Tower, Piccadilly Plaza

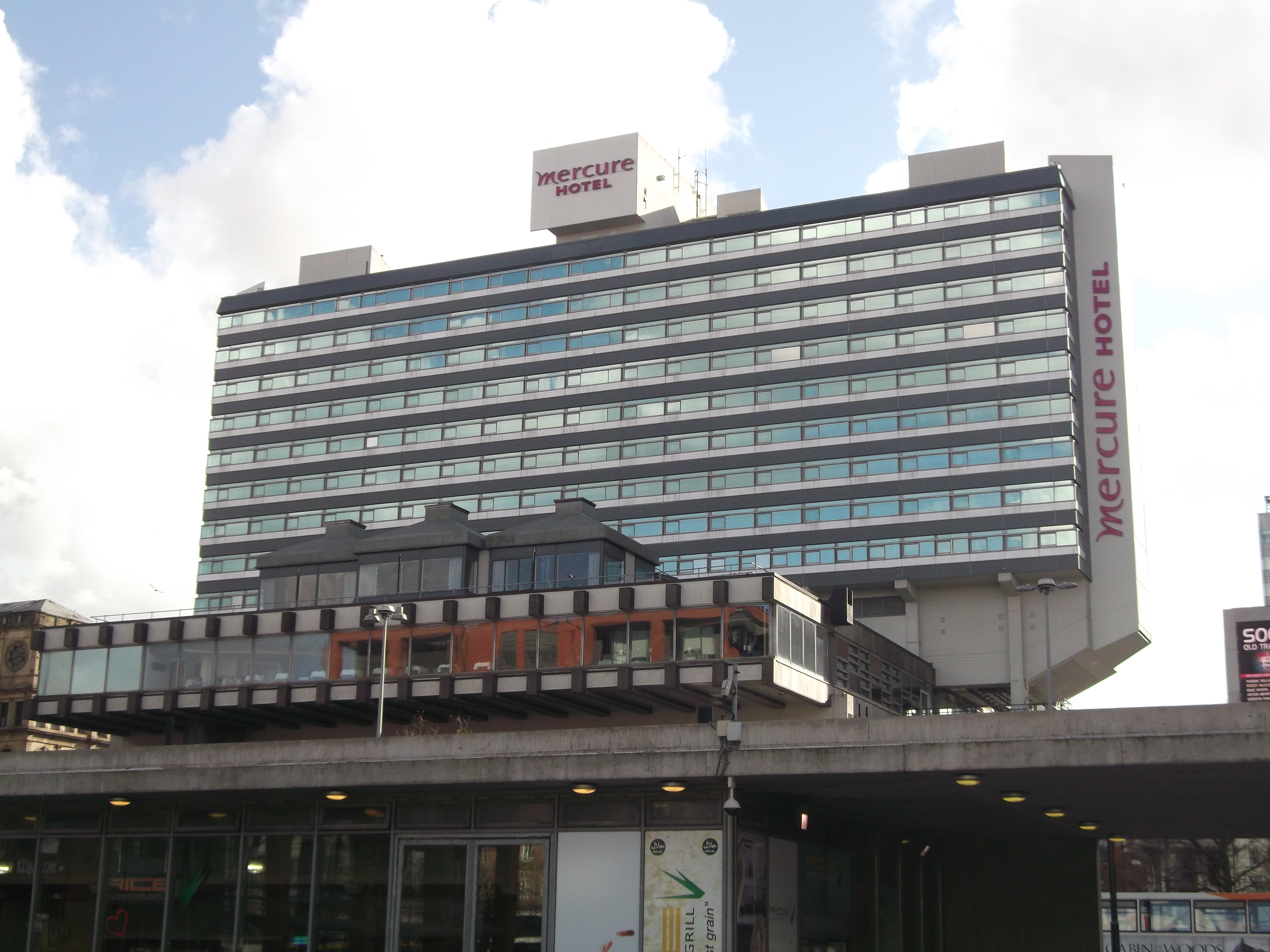
Mercure Piccadilly Hotel, Piccadilly Plaza

The square is surrounded by buildings that cover the ages of modern Manchester. From old Victorian warehouses and shops dating from the Industrial Revolution, and Manchester's role as the cotton marketing capital to the new office block development, which is part of the 21st century regeneration of the square. The building that visitors are likely to notice first is the huge complex of Piccadilly Plaza.

- One Piccadilly Gardens, built in 2003, lies on the eastern edge of the square and houses offices on six floors, with shops and restaurants on the ground floor. It is sited between Piccadilly and the square itself.

=== Piccadilly Plaza ===
Piccadilly Plaza was originally built by Covell Matthews and Partners from 1959 to 1965 and was remodelled by Leslie Jones Architects in 2001; this mainly involved replacing the old Chinese style-roofed towers of Bernard House. Piccadilly Plaza contains the renovated Mercure Hotel (formerly known as the Ramada Manchester Piccadilly and Jarvis Piccadilly Hotel); the refurbishment was completed in 2008. The huge tower block, originally known as Sunley Tower, was renamed City Tower. In 2005, the Plaza underwent large-scale remodelling with recladding of the tower and cleaning of concrete façades. The complex received investment from Bruntwood Ltd, which bought Piccadilly Plaza in 2004–05, and now has several retail outlets on ground level and large office space on the levels above. It was once the home of Piccadilly Radio.

=== Thistle and Britannia Hotels ===
The Thistle Hotel stands on the south-eastern side of Piccadilly Gardens. The hotel was originally three cotton warehouses (with a fourth standing to the left), which made up the four warehouses designed by Edward Walters between 1851 and 1858. Also, there is the Grade II* listed Britannia Hotel on Portland Street, which was formerly the largest of Manchester warehouses, Watts Warehouse (architects Travis & Mangnall).

=== Wheel of Manchester ===
From 2013 to 2015, the Wheel of Manchester was based in the square.

=== Listed buildings around Piccadilly Gardens ===
| Building | Photograph | Notes | Listed | Ref. |
|---|---|---|---|---|
| 1 Piccadilly | | | Grade II on 2 October 1974 | |
| 12 Mosley Street | | Architect Thomas Worthington (1826–1909) born in Salford. Worthington was the architect for the Albert Memorial (for Prince Albert) which stands in front of Manchester Town Hall in Albert Square. | Grade II on 2 October 1974 | |
| 15 and 17 Piccadilly | | Including nos. 1–3 Oldham Street. Architect Royle & Bennett. | Grade II on 19 June 1988 | |
| 38–50 Piccadilly | | Joshua Hoyle Building including Roby House. Now converted into the Malmaison Hotel. | Grade II on 16 July 1987 | |
| 47 Piccadilly | | | Grade II on 5 June 1994 | |
| 49 Piccadilly | | | Grade II on 5 June 1994 | |
| 51–57 Piccadilly | | | Grade II on 5 June 1994 | |
| 59 and 61 Piccadilly | | Clayton House. | Grade II on 5 June 1994 | |
| 69–75 Piccadilly | | Halls Buildings. | Grade II on 19 June 1988 | |
| 77–83 Piccadilly | | | Grade II on 19 June 1988 | |
| 97 Piccadilly | | Brunswick Hotel (includes 2 and 4 Paton Street). | Grade II on 2 October 1974 | |
| 107 Piccadilly | | Originally a showroom and warehouse on a corner site, designed by Charles Henry Heathcote, later a hotel. | Grade II on 2 October 1974 | |

=== Monuments ===
A number of statues stand around Piccadilly Gardens commemorating noted figures. These four statues stand on what was the esplanade of the infirmary and were erected at different times before the hospital closed:

- Sir Robert Peel (1850) by William Calder Marshall: Born 1788 in Bury, Prime Minister and reformer. Figure flanked by two allegorical figures representing trade and commerce and the arts and science. Grade II listed on 3 October 1974.
- James Watt (1857) by William Theed, after Francis Chantrey: Engineer of the Industrial Revolution. This is copy of Chantrey's statue in St Paul's Cathedral, London. Grade II listed on 3 October 1974.
- Duke of Wellington (1853) by Matthew Noble: Wellington is depicted speaking in the House of Lords. He is surrounded by four allegorical bronze figures representing Victory, Mars, Minerva and Peace. Around the plinth are four bronze reliefs depicting the Battle of Assaye; Wellington in the House of Commons; the Battle of Waterloo; and Wellington at the Congress of Vienna. Grade II listed on 3 October 1974.
- Queen Victoria (1901) by Edward Onslow Ford: Large bronze of Queen Victoria seated on a marble throne; below is a bronze sculpture of St George and the Dragon and, at the rear, an allegorical figure representing motherhood. Commissioned to celebrate Victoria's Diamond Jubilee, it was erected shortly after her death in 1901. Grade II listed on 3 October 1974.
Piccadilly Gardens monuments

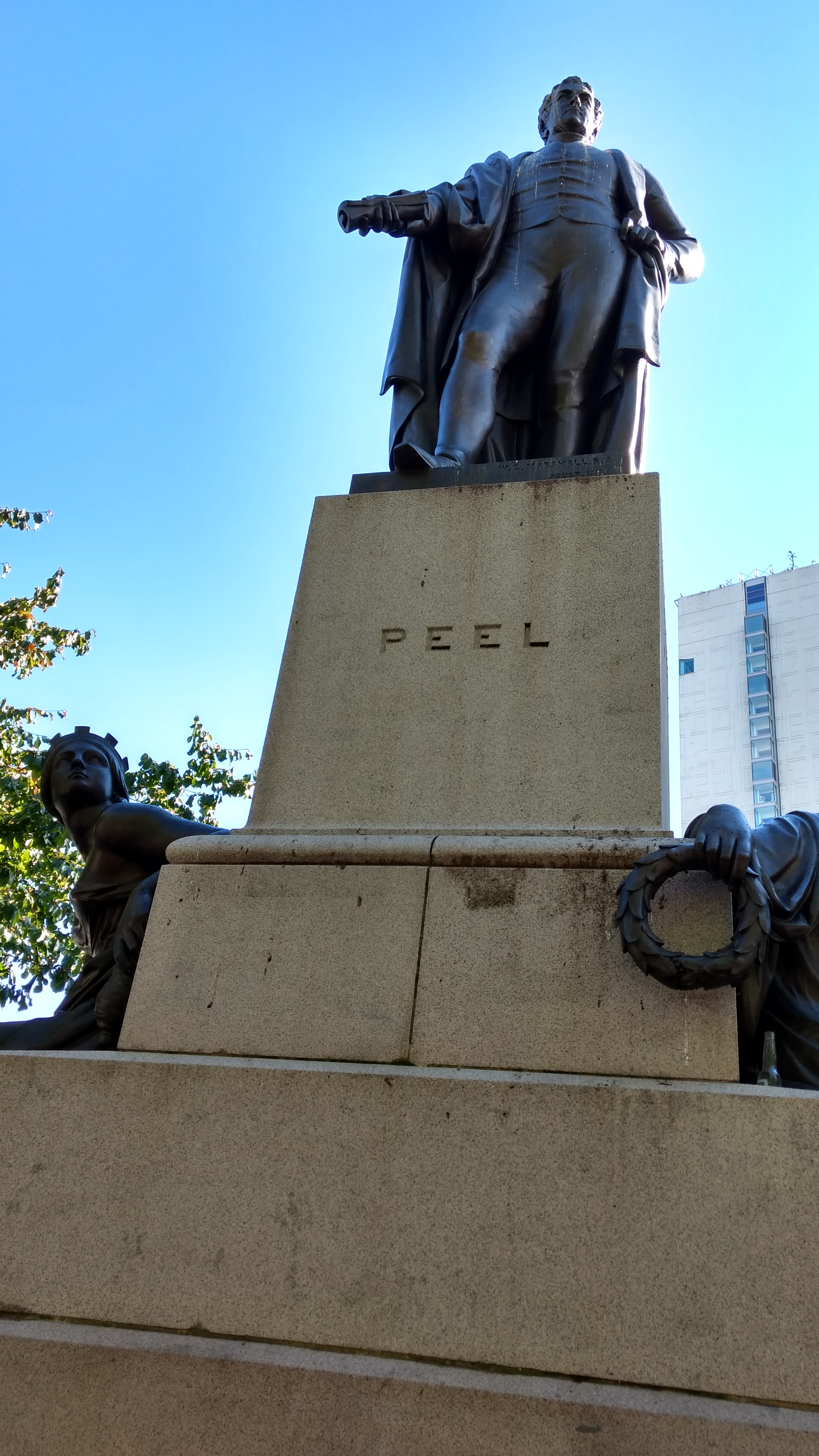
Sir Robert Peel (1850)

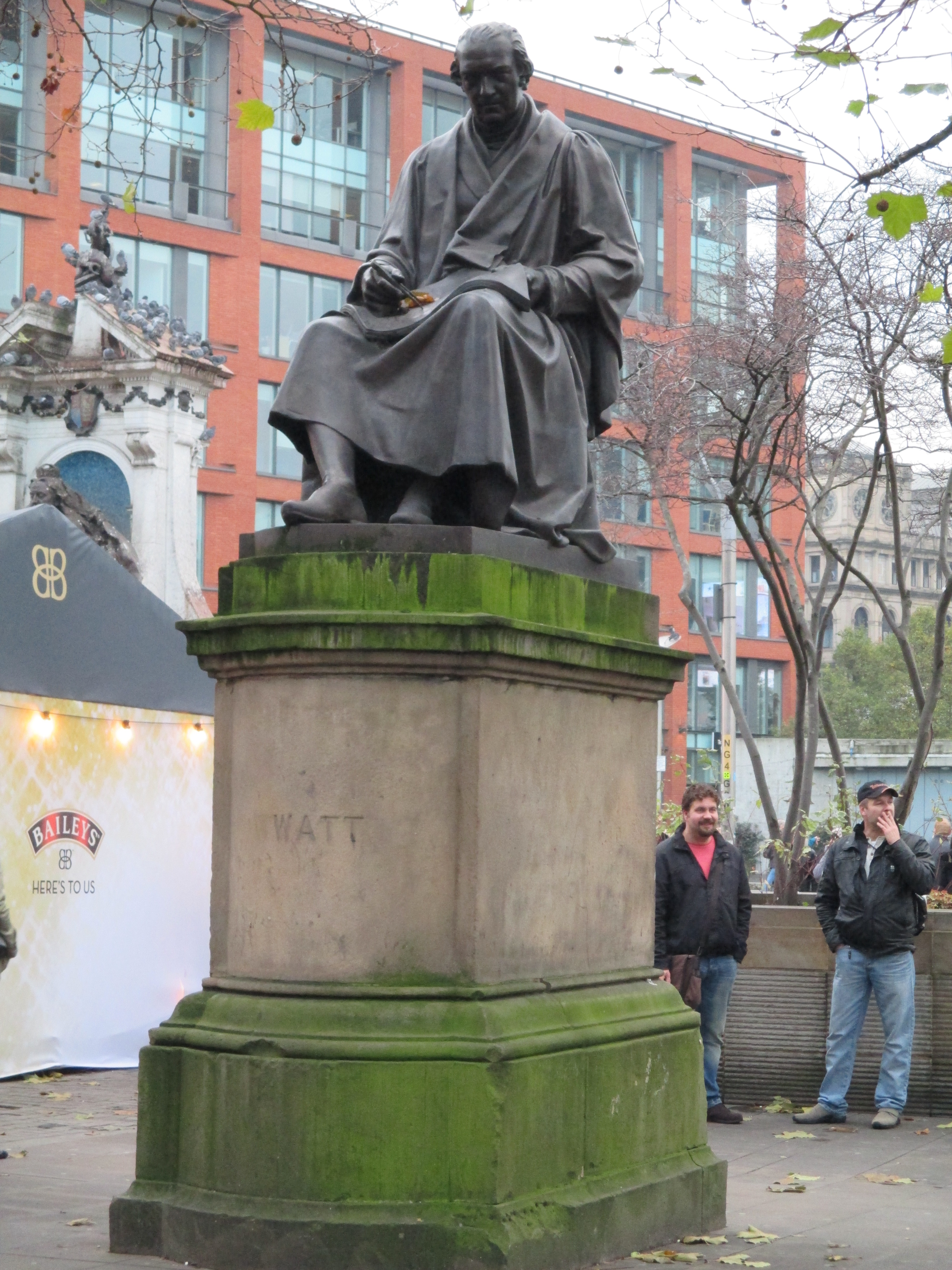
James Watt (1857)

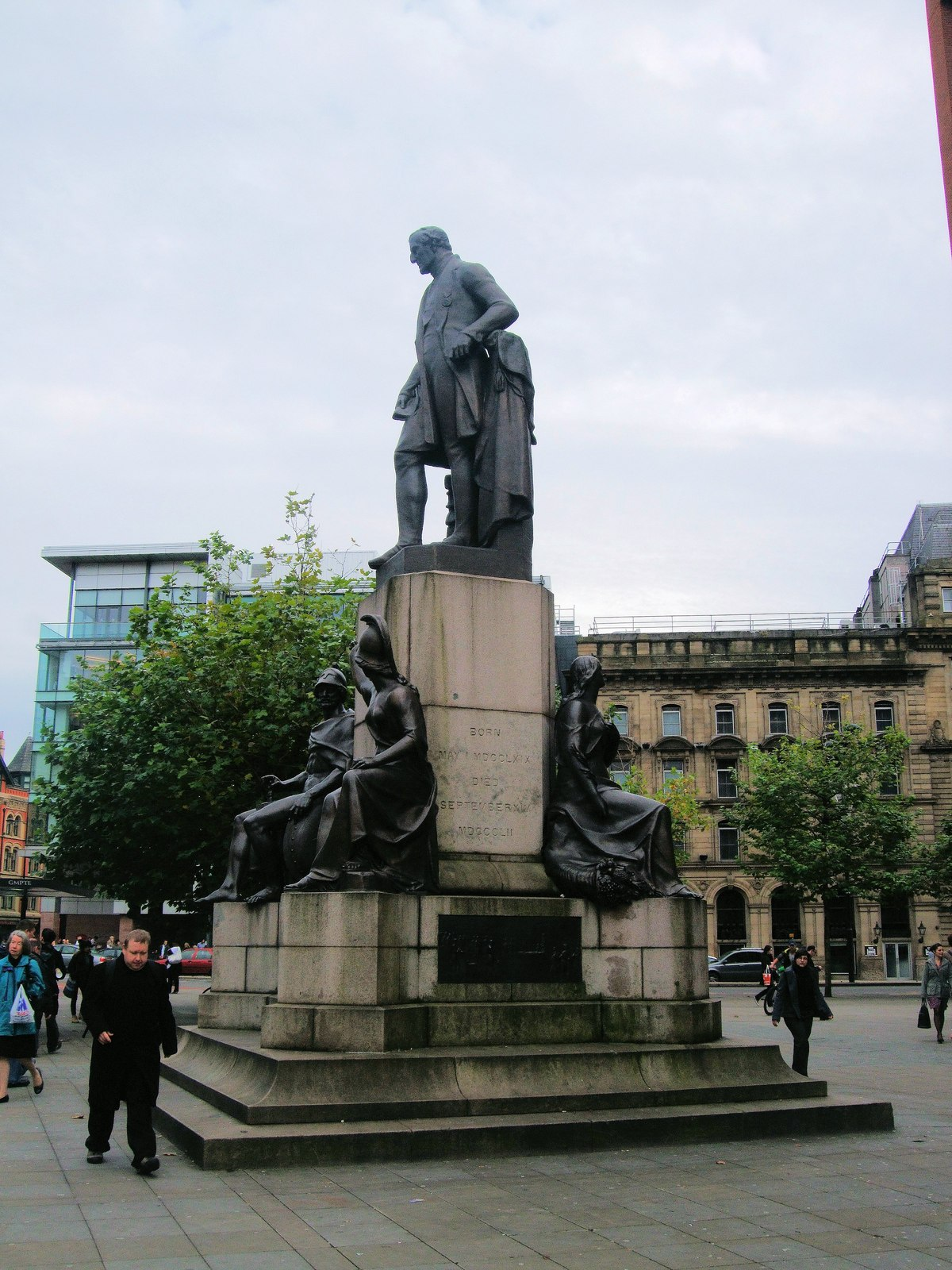
Duke of Wellington (1853)

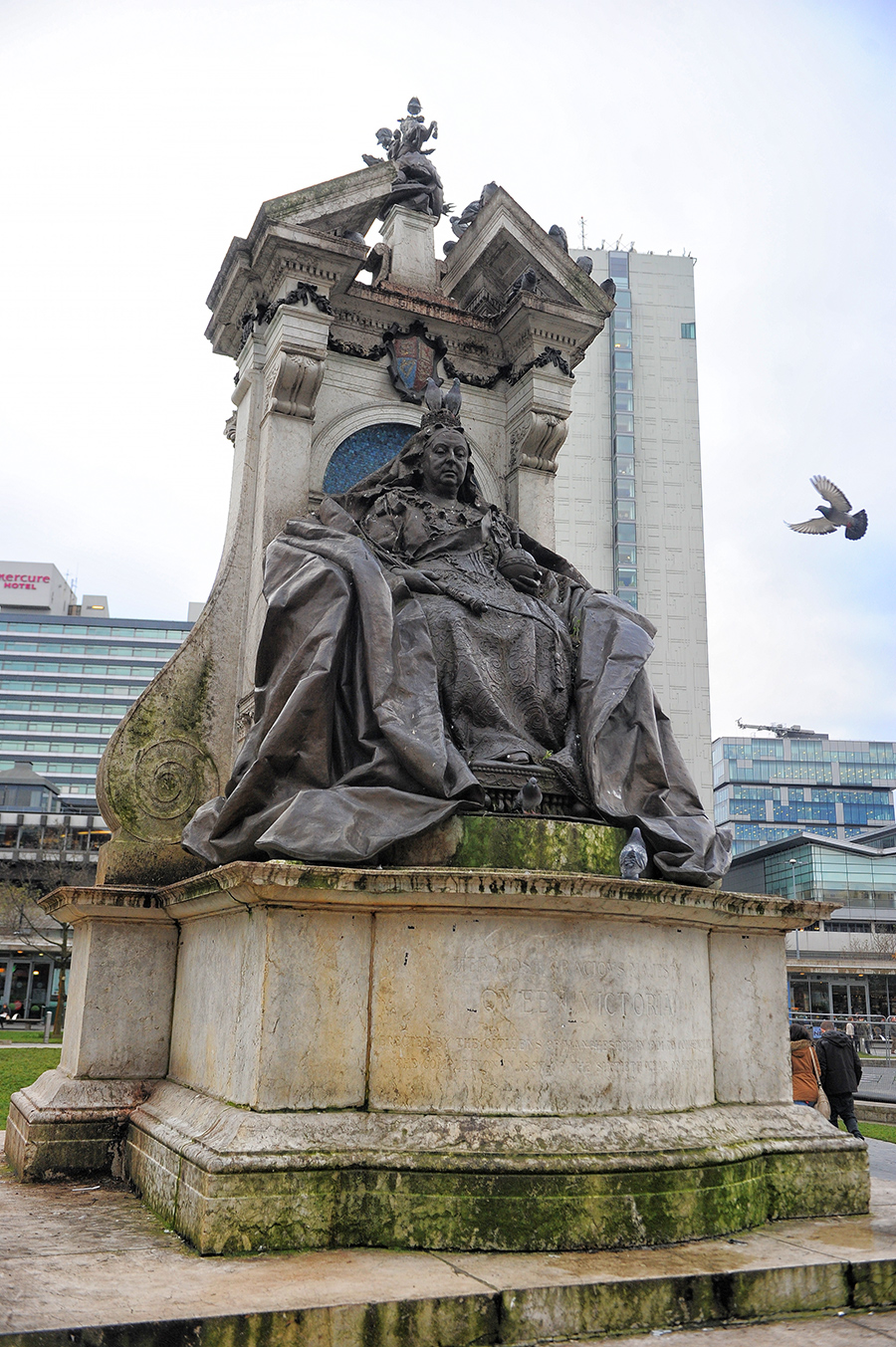
Queen Victoria (1901)

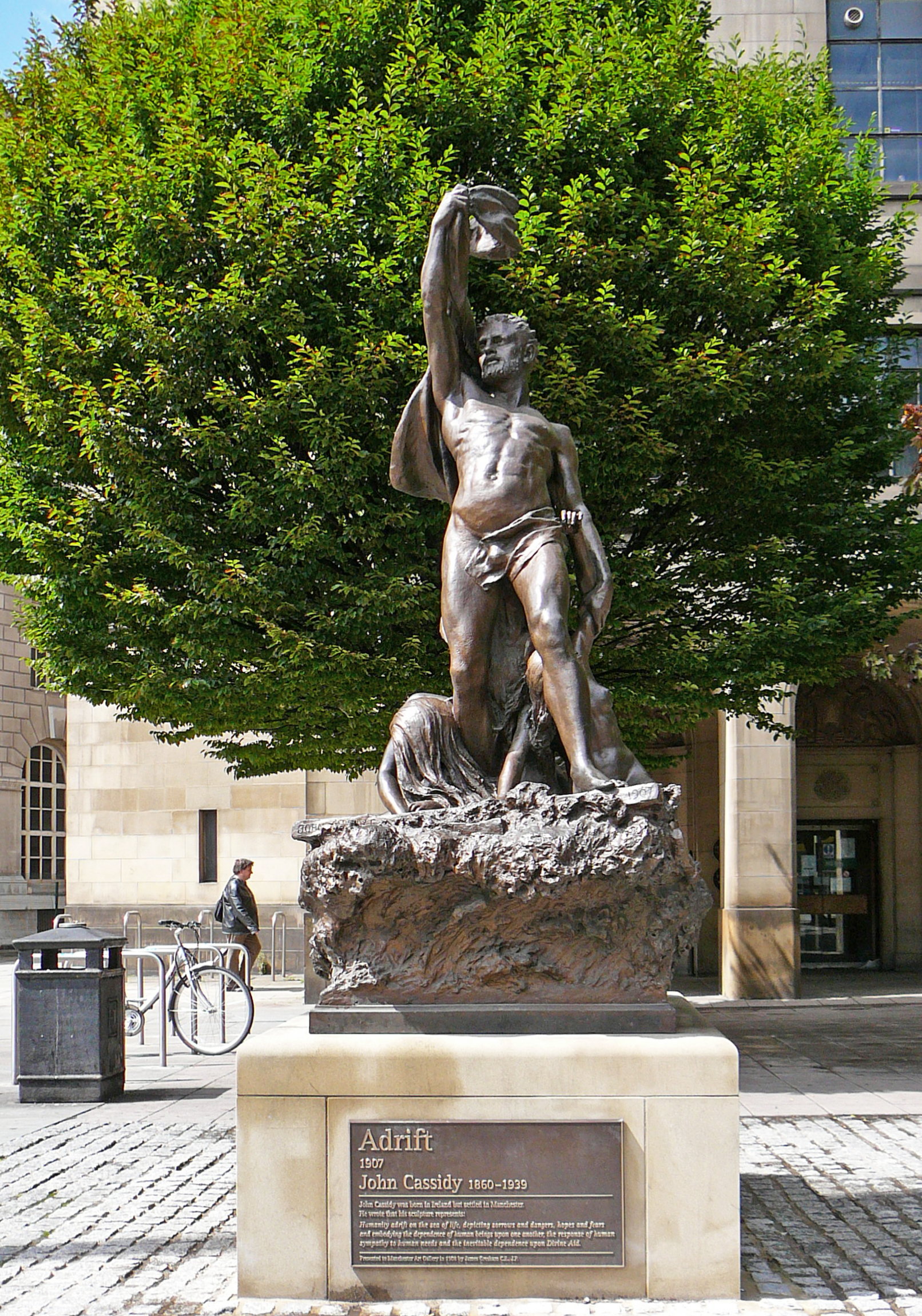
Adrift (1907), now in St Peter's Square

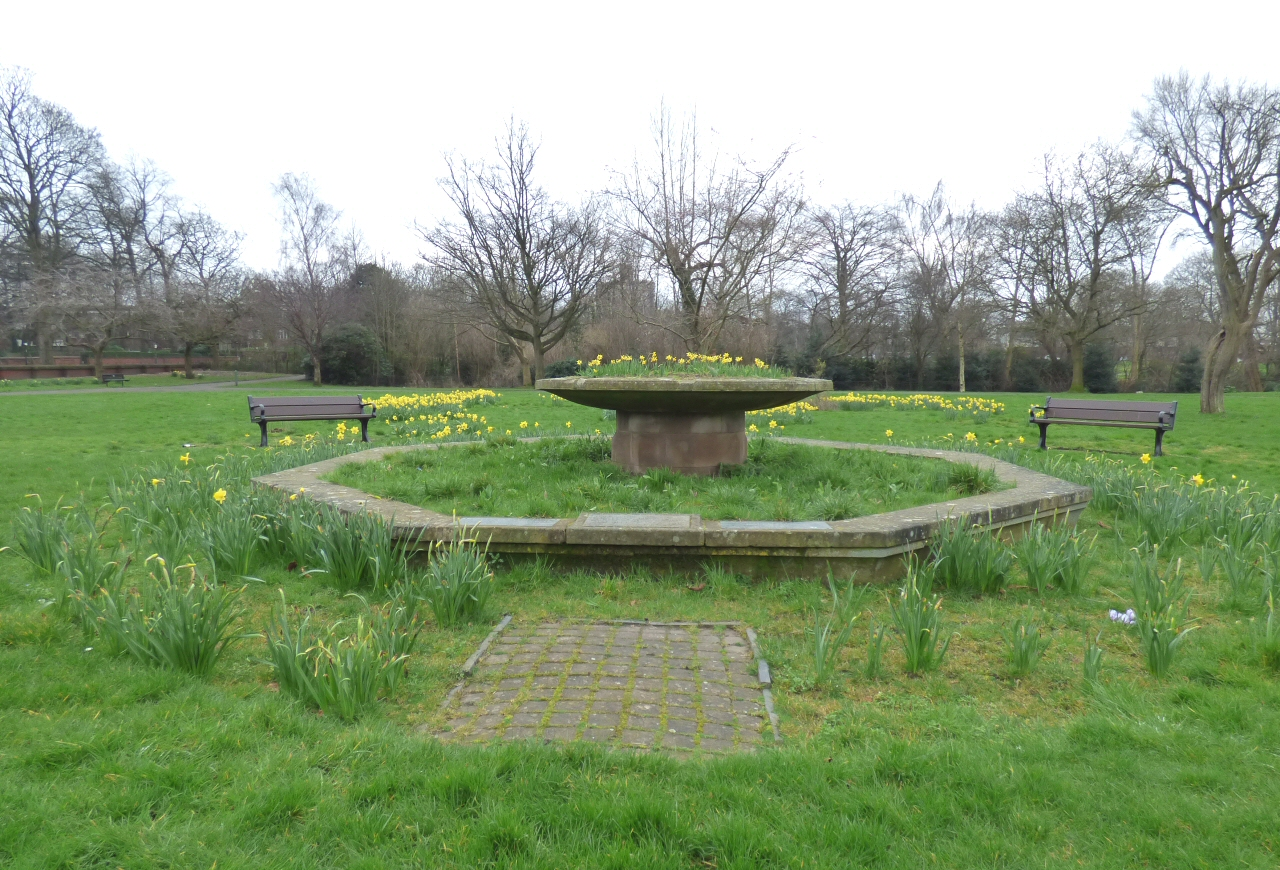
The Queen Elizabeth Coronation Fountain (1953), now in Platt Fields Park

John Cassidy's 1907 sculpture Adrift was removed from Piccadilly Gardens in 2003, to make way for the construction of the One Piccadilly Gardens office block; it now stands in front of the Central Library in St Peter's Square. The 1953 Coronation Fountain was removed during the 2002 redesign of the gardens and has been installed in Platt Fields Park, Fallowfield.
