= Collins Hemingway =

American writer

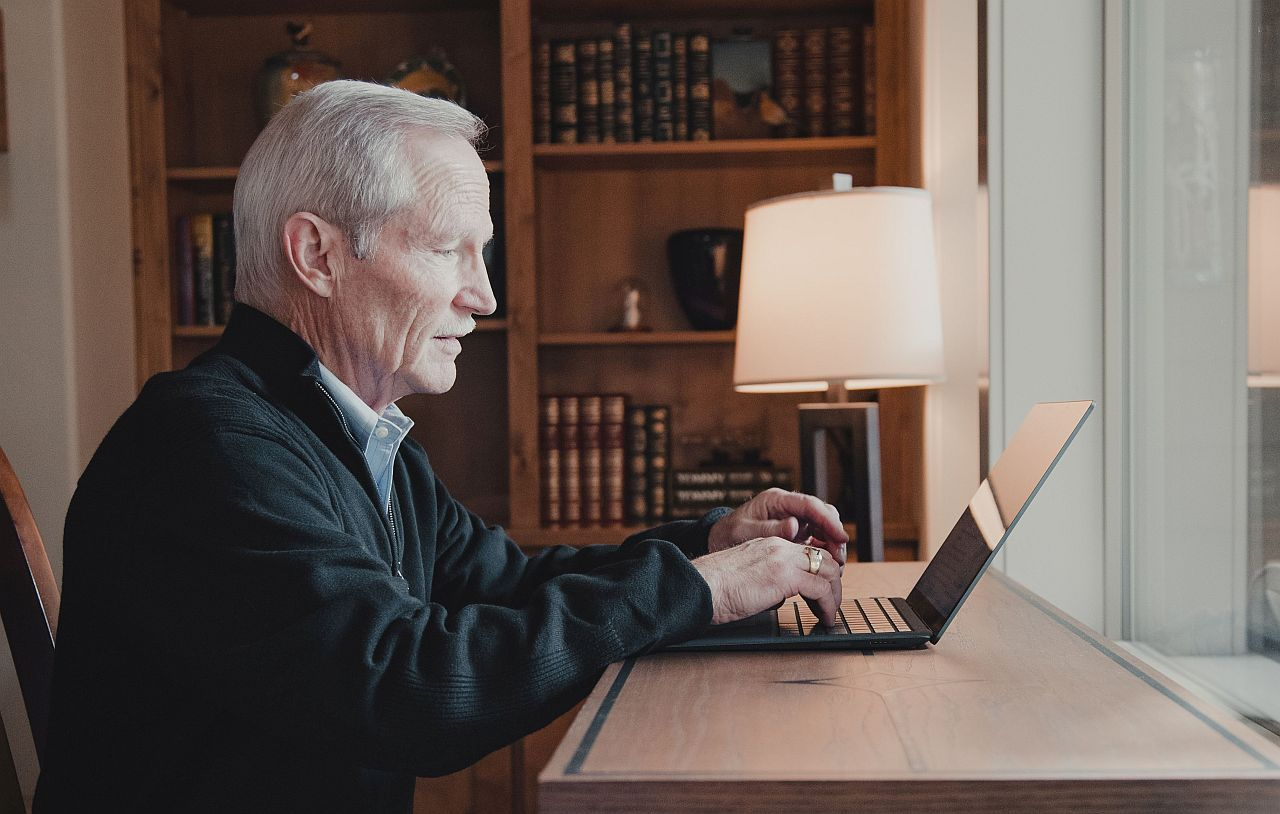
- Born: January 9, 1950 (age 76); Little Rock, Arkansas
- Education: Bachelor’s in English Literature from the University of Arkansas, Master’s in English Literature from the University of Oregon
- Occupation: Author
- Children: 3

Collins Hemingway (born January 9, 1950) is an American author.

Hemingway's first book collaboration was with Microsoft founder Bill Gates on the bestselling book Business @ the Speed of Thought. Other projects include Built for Growth with Arthur Rubinfeld.

== Early life and education ==
Hemingway was born and raised in Little Rock, Arkansas. He got his professional start as a part-time sports reporter for the Arkansas Gazette during his senior year of high school. He worked his way through college and graduate school as a journalist, earning a BA in English literature with a minor in science in 1972 from the University of Arkansas, Phi Beta Kappa, and an MA in English literature from the University of Oregon in 1979.

== Career ==
Hemingway became involved with early minicomputer newspaper technology at the Arkansas Democrat-Gazette between 1974 and 1976. He then joined the editorial staff of the Eugene Register Guard in 1976 in Oregon, where he was instrumental in implementing one of the first all-electronic newsrooms in the U.S.

In 1980 Hemingway joined Oregon Software, a Portland-based software company, as a technical writer and later technical marketer. He then joined WE Communications, where he worked primarily on the Microsoft account. He was recruited by Microsoft in 1992 as director of systems public relations. He became director of business development and international marketing of the Business Systems Division in 1994; and director of executive communications for Gates and company president Steve Ballmer in 1996. Hemingway's career as a book author launched when he collaborated with Gates on a book about the impact of the internet on business.

Hemingway has co-authored five books and has written a three-volume series that speculates on what could have happened during a seven-year span in which little is known of Jane Austen's life. He has published 17 essays in Austen journals or magazines and speaks regularly at related events.

== Books ==
- Gates, Bill; Hemingway, Collins (1999). Business @ the Speed of Thought. Warner Books. ISBN 978-0670886647.
- Rubinfeld, Arthur; Hemingway Collins (2005). Built For Growth: Expanding Your Business Around The Corner Or Across The Globe. Wharton School Publishing. ISBN 978-0131465749.
- Baker, Dan; Greenberg, Kathy, Hemingway, Collins (2006). What Happy Companies Know: How the New Science of Happiness Can Change Your Company for the Better. Pearson Prentice Hall. ISBN 978-0131858572.
- Marcus, Robert; Hemingway, Collins (2012). The Fifth Wave: A Strategic Vision for Mobile Internet Innovation, Investment and Return. ISBN 979-1091270069.
- Breznitz, Shlomo; Hemingway, Collins (2013). Maximum Brainpower: Challenging the Brain for Health and Wisdom. Ballantine Books. ISBN 978-0345526151.
- Hemingway, Collins (2015). The Marriage of Miss Jane Austen Volume I. ISBN 978-1985281646.
- Hemingway, Collins (2016). The Marriage of Miss Jane Austen Volume II. ISBN 978-1535444958.
- Hemingway, Collins (2017). The Marriage of Miss Jane Austen Volume III. ISBN 978-1979472760.
