= Rubinfeld =

Rubinfeld is a surname. Notable people with this surname include:

- Arthur Rubinfeld, former Chief Creative Officer at Starbucks
- Daniel L. Rubinfeld, American economist
- Ronitt Rubinfeld (born 1964), American electrical engineer and computer scientist
