= Dashboard (computing) =

Information Graphical User Interface

In computer information systems, a dashboard is a type of graphical user interface which often provides at-a-glance views of data relevant to a particular objective or process through a combination of visualizations and summary information. In other usage, "dashboard" is another name for "progress report" or "report" and is considered a form of data visualization.

The dashboard is often accessible by a web browser and is typically linked to regularly updating data sources. Dashboards are often interactive and facilitate users to explore the data themselves, usually by clicking into elements to view more detailed information.

The term dashboard originates from the automobile dashboard where drivers monitor the major functions at a glance via the instrument panel.

== History ==
The idea of digital dashboards followed the study of decision support systems in the 1970s. Early predecessors of the modern business dashboard were first developed in the 1980s in the form of Executive Information Systems (EISs). Due to problems primarily with data refreshing and handling, it was soon realized that the approach wasn't practical as information was often incomplete, unreliable, and spread across too many disparate sources. Thus, EISs hibernated until the 1990s when the information age quickened pace and data warehousing, and online analytical processing (OLAP) allowed dashboards to function adequately. Despite the availability of enabling technologies, the dashboard use didn't become popular until later in that decade, with the rise of key performance indicators (KPIs), and the introduction of Robert S. Kaplan and David P. Norton's balanced scorecard. In the late 1990s, Microsoft promoted a concept known as the Digital Nervous System and "digital dashboards" were described as being one leg of that concept. Today, the use of dashboards forms an important part of Business Performance Management (BPM). Initially dashboards were used for monitoring purposes, now with the advancement of technology, dashboards are being used for more analytical purposes. The use of dashboards has now been incorporating; scenario analysis, drill down capabilities, and presentation format flexibility.

== Benefits ==
Digital dashboards allow managers to monitor the contribution of the various departments in their organization. In addition, they enable “rolling up” of information to present a consolidated view across an organization. To gauge exactly how well an organization is performing overall, digital dashboards allow you to capture and report specific data points from each department within the organization, thus providing a "snapshot" of performance.

Benefits of using digital dashboards include:

- Visual presentation of performance measures
- Ability to identify and correct negative trends
- Measure efficiencies/inefficiencies
- Ability to generate detailed reports showing new trends
- Ability to make more informed decisions based on collected business intelligence

Dashboards offer a view of the entire business as it gives the manager a bird's eye view into the performance of sales, data inventory, web traffic, social media analytics and other associated data that is visually presented on a single dashboard. Web analytics can play a crucial role in shaping the marketing strategy of many businesses.

== Align strategies and organizational goals ==
- Gain total visibility of all systems instantly
- Quick identification of data outliers and correlations
- Consolidated reporting into one location
- Available on mobile devices to quickly access metrics

== Classification ==
Dashboards can be broken down according to role and are either strategic, analytical, operational, or informational. Dashboards are the 3rd step on the information ladder, demonstrating the conversion of data to increasingly valuable insights.

Strategic dashboards support managers at any level in an organization and provide the quick overview that decision-makers need to monitor the health and opportunities of the business. Dashboards of this type focus on high-level measures of performance and forecasts. Strategic dashboards benefit from static snapshots of data (daily, weekly, monthly, and quarterly) that are not constantly changing from one moment to the next.

Dashboards for analytical purposes often include more context, comparisons, and history, along with subtler performance evaluators. In addition, analytical dashboards typically support interactions with the data, such as drilling down into the underlying details. Dashboards for monitoring operations are often designed differently from those that support strategic decision making or data analysis and often require monitoring of activities and events that are constantly changing and might require attention and response at a moment's notice.

== Types of dashboards ==
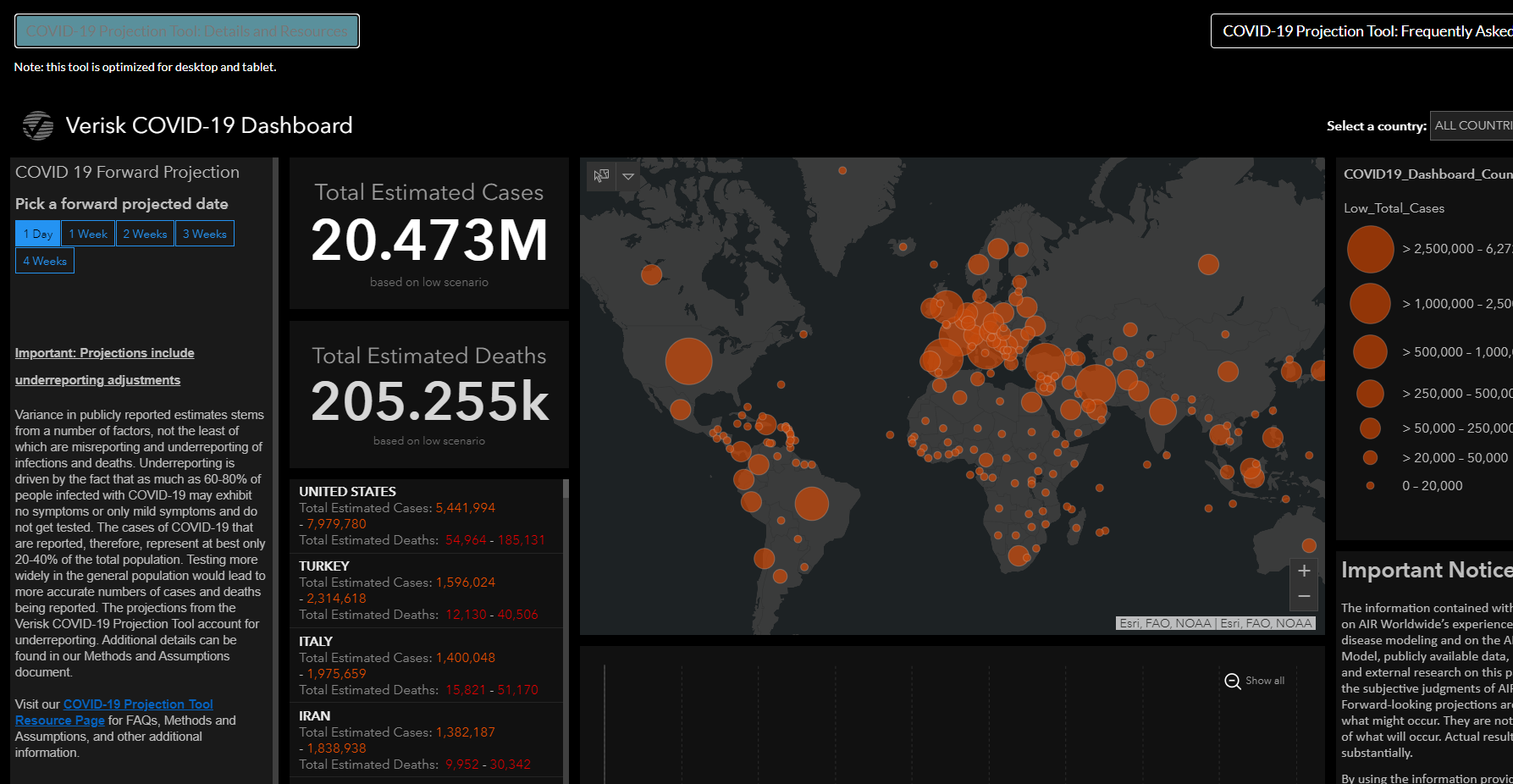
Screenshot of Verisk COVID-19 Projection Tool

Digital dashboards may be laid out to track the flows inherent in the business processes that they monitor. Graphically, users may see the high-level processes and then drill down into low-level data. This level of detail is often buried deep within the corporate enterprise and otherwise unavailable to the senior executives.

Three main types of digital dashboards dominate the market today: desktop software applications, web-browser-based applications, and desktop applications are also known as desktop widgets. The last are driven by a widget engine.

Both Desktop and Browser-based providers enable the distribution of dashboards via a web browser. An example of the latter is web-based-browser Asana, which helps teams orchestrate their work, from daily tasks to strategic cross-functional initiatives. With it, teams can manage everything from company objectives to digital transformation to product launches and marketing campaigns.

Specialized dashboards may track all corporate functions. Examples include human resources, recruiting, sales, operations, security, information technology, project management, customer relationship management, digital marketing and many more departmental dashboards. For a smaller organization like a startup a compact startup scorecard dashboard tracks important activities across lot of domains ranging from social media to sales.

Digital dashboard projects involve business units as the driver and the information technology department as the enabler. Therefore, the success of dashboard projects depends on the relevancy/importance of information provided within the dashboard. This includes the metrics chosen to monitor and the timeliness of the data forming those metrics; data must be up to date and accurate.

Key performance indicators, balanced scorecards, and sales performance figures are some of the content appropriate on business dashboards.

=== Performance Dashboards ===
Dashboards involve the combination of visual and functional features. This combination of features helps improve cognition and interpretation. A performance dashboard sits at the intersection of two powerful disciplines: business intelligence and performance management. Therefore, there are different users who could use these dashboards for different reasons. For example, a level of workers could look at monitoring inventory while those in more managerial roles can look at lagging measure. Then executives could utilize the dashboard to evaluate strategic performance against objectives.

== Dashboards and scorecards ==
Balanced scorecards and dashboards have been linked together as if they were interchangeable. However, although both visually display critical information, the difference is in the format: Scorecards can open the quality of an operation while dashboards provide calculated direction. A balanced scorecard has what they called a "prescriptive" format. It should always contain these components:

- Perspectives – group
- Objectives – verb-noun phrases pulled from a strategy plan
- Measures – also called metric or key performance indicators (KPIs)
- Spotlight indicators – red, yellow, or green symbols that provide an at-a-glance view of a measure's performance.

Each of these sections ensures that a Balanced Scorecard is essentially connected to the businesses critical strategic needs.

The design of a dashboard is more loosely defined. Dashboards are usually a series of graphics, charts, gauges and other visual indicators that can be monitored and interpreted. Even when there is a strategic link, on a dashboard, it may not be noticed as such since objectives are not normally present on dashboards. However, dashboards can be customized to link their graphs and charts to strategic objectives.

== Design ==
Digital dashboard technology is available "out-of-the-box" from many software providers. Some companies, however, continue to do in-house development and maintenance of dashboard applications. For example, GE Aviation has developed a proprietary software/portal called "Digital Cockpit" to monitor the trends in the aircraft spare parts business.

Good dashboard design practices take into account and address the following:

- the medium it is designed for (desktop, laptop, mobile, tablet)
- use of visuals over the tabular presentation of data
- bar charts: to visualize one or more series of data
- line charts: to track changes in several dependent data sets over a period of time
- sparklines: to show the trend in a single data set
- scorecards: to monitor KPIs and trends
- use of legends anytime more than one color or shape is present on a graph
- spatial arrangement: place your most important view on the top left (if the language is written left to right) then arrange the following views in a Z pattern with the most important information following the top-to-bottom, left-to-right pattern
- use colorblind friendly palettes with color used consistently and only where necessary

=== Assessing the quality of dashboards ===
There are a few key elements to a good dashboard:.

1. Simple, communicates easily
2. Minimum distractions...it could cause confusion
3. Supports organized business with meaning and useful data
4. Applies human visual perception to visual presentation of information
5. It can be accessed easily by its intended audience

A research-based framework for Business Intelligence dashboard design suggests that "cross-visual interactivity" is the most impactful of all features.

== Dashboard software ==
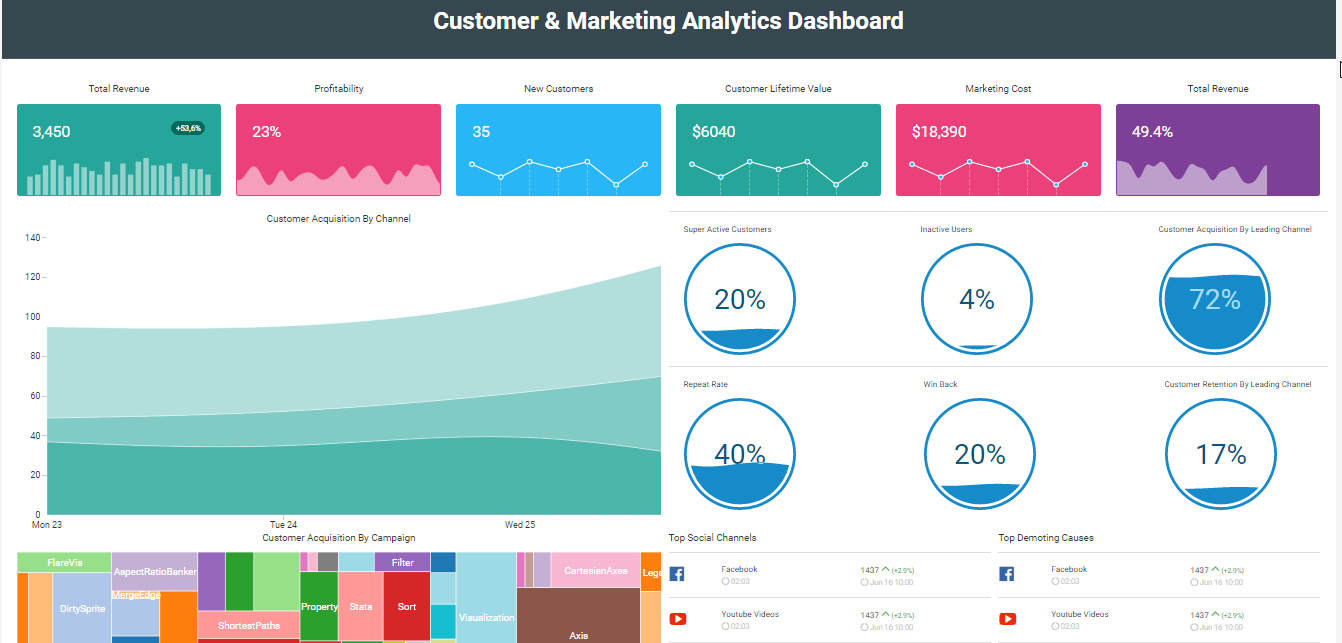
This is an example of a dashboard that can be created using one of the programs presented.

Dashboards serve as a visual representation for a company to monitor progress and trends, not only among themselves but against other companies as well. Dashboards and visualizations contain data that is updated in real time. For example, if the underlying data in an Excel spreadsheet were to change, so would the visualization.

=== Power BI ===
Power BI provides the tools for a user to create different types of visualizations to communicate the data that they are using. Some examples of these visualizations include graphs, maps, and clustered columns. Power BI pulls data from Excel that can be used to create dashboards and visualizations. Whereas Excel does not import data from Power BI. Excel is typically used for less data and Power BI is more complex. Power BI can be used to display trends over time. For example, a company can create a time plot that shows its costs and revenues over a certain period. The data can then be arranged to show per day, month, quarter, year, etc. This requires simple formatting tools so the data can quickly be changed and compared. Power BI allows the user to customize their visualizations by adding colors and labels. In addition, when the user clicks a data point, they are able to understand what the point or selection is showing. Power BI also has a commonly used map feature where businesses can view their sales and earnings across different states and countries. Places with the highest amounts of data will appear larger in size. For example, a state with the most revenue will be bigger than states with less data. Power BI is also interactive in that in any type of map a person can expand a specific category to look deeper into the data contained.

=== Tableau ===
Tableau is another program that allows users to create dashboards. Allegedly, One of Tableau's biggest advantages is how much data it can hold. Tableau can hold an unlimited amount, whereas an Excel spreadsheet has a capacity of 1,048,576 rows. However, it is possible to hold and analyze effectively billions of rows in Excel, using its Power Pivot feature. Tableau has the ability to make interactive dashboards by clicking into a specific point. For example, you can have data be displayed within a map. By clicking a specific state or city you can get a closer look at the data contained within that location. Filters and parameters can also be added. For example, if one were to analyze revenues across the United States you could set a parameter to only show salaries within a particular range. Once set, only states within this range will be highlighted.

=== Excel ===
Excel has many tools that help the user not only implement data but also visualize data. Excel has many built in functions that can help break down data and also separate data by scenarios. The user can easily download and add files to their Excel sheets to use for their data. Other tools Excel offers is the use of conditional formatting and basic pivot tables and charts. Excel allows the user to reference other cells which ultimately allows for complex computations to be made and conclusions to be drawn from data.

== Guidelines for dashboard design ==
There are certain guidelines that can be useful when creating dashboards and other visualizations. The guidelines have a structure that can be followed and that is beginning with reading direction. When it comes to how you are arranging your information on your dashboard or a visualization it can be helpful to think about reading direction. General reading direction is from left to right and from top to bottom. Having information flow in this structure will allow others to read and understand your visuals in a more natural structure. Local proximity is another idea to keep in mind when creating a visual or a dashboard. Having information in a close proximity can be compared with a better effectiveness and allow users to draw conclusions. Being able to make sure the user is not being overloaded with information when creating your visual. Having a few key figures with significant importance can be more helpful compared to having too much information. When you have too much information and not a structure to what you are presenting then that is known as a “data graveyard”. Another aspect to keep in mind while creating visuals that goes along with information overload is the idea of interaction within your visual. Interacting with the dashboard would allow for further detail to be obtained from the user and allow them to better understand the information on your dashboard.

Chart visualization is an important aspect when creating dashboards, diagrams in particular. When you have complex data it can be difficult to come to conclusions from that material and being able to have different visual elements within the dashboard can be helpful in giving a larger overview of the material. Being able to have a visual reporting system allows multiple processing operations to be carried out and that could increase the effectiveness of decisions. There are different types of visualizations that can be seen as more effective depending on the data type and the recipient. Looking at traditional business graphics in an interactive form is another aspect to keep in mind when creating a dashboard. Business charts are used mainly in the form of interactive dashboards. A major advantage of business charts is that the majority of users have an understanding of them.

There are many connections between dashboards and accounting. Dashboards aid with budgeting, management control, and wage control. Dashboards are used to present data in a quick and easy to read way. The ability to present data in a quick way with a visual allows for more data to be processed and understood. Dashboards are used for performance reports, sales analysis on sectors, and inventory rotation. Dashboards should be quick visualizations that allow decisions to be made quicker than they usually would without the access to dashboard technology.

Dashboards are also used in accounting decision making settings. The data can help prove a change is efficient or inefficient and therefore help with improving systems throughout an organization.

In order for a dashboard to be efficient, the individual creating the dashboard needs to make sure that the information is simple and easy to read and be interpreted.

== See also ==
- Complex event processing
- Corporate performance management
- Data presentation architecture
- Event stream processing
- Information graphics
- Information design
- Scientific visualization
- Control panel (software)
