= World class =

World class is a superlative that can refer to:

== Names ==
World class forms part (or all) of the following names:

=== Sports and Competitions ===
- World Class Championship Wrestling
- FAI World Class
- World Class Tag Team Championship
- Drum Corps International World Class Champions
- International World Class Championship Wrestling
- World Class Heavyweight Championship
- World Class Aviation Academy Giants
- U.S. Army World Class Athlete Program

=== Games ===
- World Class Baseball, a video game
- World Class Leaderboard, a golf simulation video game
- World Class Soccer, a 1990 soccer video game
- World Class Track Meet, a sports fitness game
- Graham Gooch World Class Cricket, a video game
- Champions World Class Soccer, a football (soccer) video game
- Bruce Jenner's World Class Decathlon, a 1996 computer game

=== Miscellaneous ===
- World Class is a 1985 album by World Class Wreckin' Cru.
- World Class Wreckin' Cru
- World-Class City
- World Class Rock
- World class standards, in education
- World Class Listening Problem, a 2006 album by Don Caballero
- World Class Cuisine, an American television program
- World Class IT, a 2009 IT management book by Peter A. High
- World-Class Instructional Design and Assessment, an educational consortium of state departments of education
- What It Takes: A Documentary About 4 World Class Triathletes' Quest for Greatness, a documentary film
