= One Piccadilly Gardens =

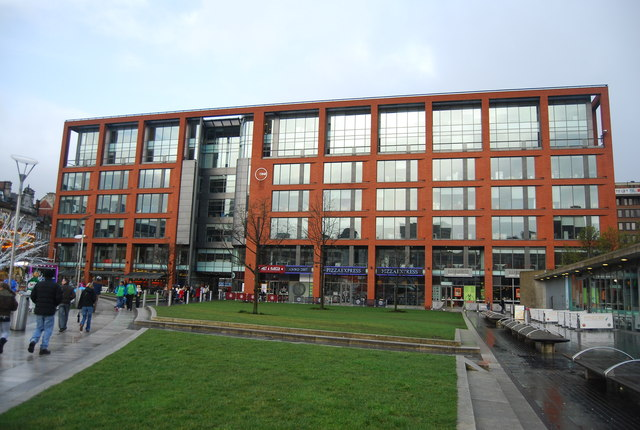
- One Piccadilly Gardens
- Interactive map of the One Piccadilly Gardens area

General information
- Status: Completed
- Type: Office
- Location: Piccadilly Gardens, 1 Piccadilly Gardens, Manchester, Manchester, England
- Coordinates: 53.480512°N 2.236168°W
- Current tenants: Allianz, BNY Mellon, JLL
- Opened: 2003
- Client: Argent Group
- Owner: Legal & General

Technical details
- Floor count: 7
- Floor area: 164,600 sqm
- Lifts/elevators: 4

Design and construction
- Architect: Allies & Morrison
- Structural engineer: Arup
- Services engineer: Arup
- Quantity surveyor: Faithful+Gould
- Main contractor: Carillion
- Awards: RIBA National Award 2004

One Piccadilly Gardens is a large office building in Manchester, England. It is located on the east side of Piccadilly Gardens, a large public square in Manchester city centre, and was built in 2003 on former public land, as part of the redevelopment of the gardens.

== History ==
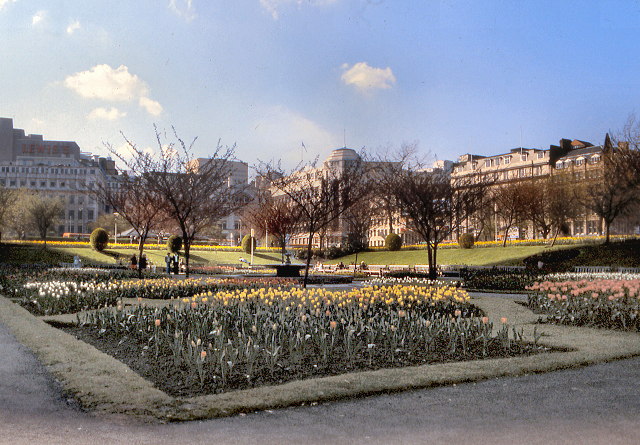
The future site of One Piccadilly Gardens pictured in 1979

The area now known as Piccadilly Gardens was donated to the City of Manchester in the 18th century by the Lord of the manor of Manchester, Sir Oswald Mosley, 2nd Baronet, of Rolleston, on condition that it should remain in public use in perpetuity, on pain of the land reverting to the Mosley family.

With Mosley's assent, the Manchester Royal Infirmary was built here in 1755. After the hospital relocated, the Infirmary building was demolished in 1910. In the 1930s, the area was landscaped and a sunken garden was laid out on the footprint of the former hospital basement, with formal flower beds, a rose garden and flowering cherry trees. At the end of the 20th century, it was decided to redevelop Piccadilly Gardens, and in the 1990s, Manchester City Council sold a parcel of land at the eastern end of the Gardens to the Argent Group property developer in order to fund the project. Commentators have noted that the disposal of land apparently contravened Lord Mosley's injunction, that the land should be retained for public use in perpetuity. As a result of the sale, the size of Piccadilly Gardens was reduced by 11%.

== Construction ==
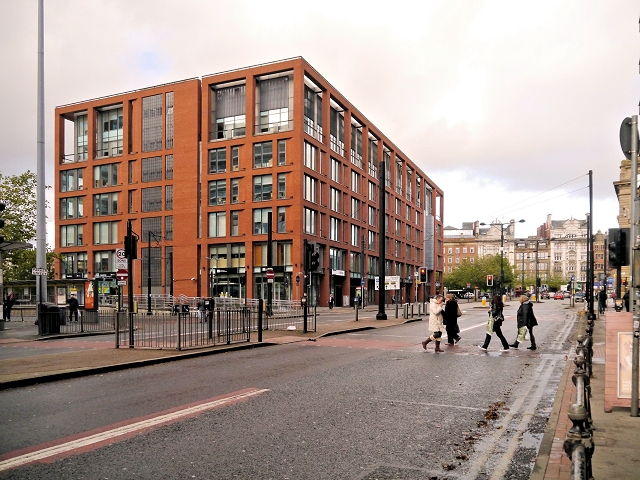
One Piccadilly Gardens seen from Portland Street

One Piccadilly Gardens opened in 2003 as part of the redevelopment of Piccadilly Gardens; the building was designed by Allies and Morrison and has large glazed facades behind a red brick grid.

The building houses six floors of office space, with shops and restaurants on the ground floor. The entrance to the offices is via a double height diagonal void through the ground and first floors of the building which links Portland Street to Piccadilly Gardens.

In 2004, the building was awarded a RIBA National Award by the Royal Institute of British Architects for providing "a strong enclosure to the space" and for its facade which "reinforces the bond with the topography" of the adjacent Gardens.

== Owners ==
Argent Group sold the building in September 2011 to Europa Capital. to Legal & General Property’s Managed Property Fund.in August 2014, One Piccadilly Gardens was purchased by Legal & General Property's Managed Property Fund. At the time, building was generating an annual rental income of more than £4.3m.

== Occupiers ==
Office space:

- Allianz
- BNY Mellon
- Mott MacDonald
- Homes England
- JLL

Ground floor:

- ASK Italian
- Barburrito
- Byron
- Pizza Express
- Pret a Manger
- Shoryu Ramen

== Sources ==
- Hartwell, Clare (2002). Manchester. Yale University Press. ISBN 978-0-300-09666-8.
- Parkinson-Bailey, John J. (2000). Manchester: An Architectural History. Manchester University Press. ISBN 978-0-7190-5606-2.
- Wyke, Terry; Cocks, Harry (2004). Public Sculpture of Greater Manchester. Liverpool University Press. ISBN 978-0-85323-567-5.
