= World Class IT =

2009 IT management book

World Class IT: Why Businesses Succeed When IT Triumphs
- Front cover
- Author: Peter A. High
- Language: English
- Publisher: Jossey-Bass
- Publication date: 2009
- Media type: Hardcover
- Pages: 161
- ISBN: 978-0-470-45018-5
- OCLC: 935610986
- LC Class: HD30.2 .H543 2009

World Class IT: Why Businesses Succeed When IT Triumphs is a 2009 IT management book by Peter A. High that aims to provide a framework by which CIOs and other executives can promote IT within a business. High outlines five principles which align IT with business strategy and allow companies to monitor and improve IT's performance. The book highlights a 2000s trend that views IT as a digital nervous system which delivers corporate thinking to business units, partners and customers. Since the 2009 publication, the book has also been published in Mandarin and Korean editions.

== Five principles of World Class IT ==
- People form the foundation of an organization. Without the right people doing the right jobs at the right time, it is difficult to achieve excellent performance.
- Infrastructure distinguishes between a reactive organization and a proactive one. If software, hardware, networks, and so on are not performing consistently, the IT organization will become lodged in reactive mode. If the infrastructure works reliably, then a greater percentage of the organization can think about the future.
- Through Project and portfolio management new capabilities can emerge within the company. It is important to ensure that the portfolio collectively supports the goals of the business and that projects are delivered on time and on budget.
- IT and business partnerships are vital. It is the IT executive's role to ensure that different groups within IT function as a team, communicating efficiently and effectively. It is equally important that IT develop partnering relationships with executive management, lines of business and key business functions to ensure ownership of and success for IT initiatives.
- External partnerships are important as outsourcing becomes more common. By contributing to the discussion about business strategy, IT is in a strong position to determine which aspects of IT are best handled by external partners. Further, IT must be adept at managing those relationships to be sure the company gains the expected value from its outsourcing activity.

== Relationship between IT and the business ==
Using a set of metrics and models, World Class IT crystallizes a strong trend that has emerged across industries in the past decade: the integration of IT and corporate business strategy. CIO Digest recognizes this pattern as key to the long-term organizational growth and development of a company.

In a 2009 IT study, Deloitte finds that IT departments are consistently under pressure to deliver business value in the face of increasingly tighter budgets. IT departments are now expected to synchronize and connect various dimensions of a business-infrastructure, customer service, and project management - yet there is debate within the industry over how to best align information technology with corporate governance. Since corporations spend large portions of their operating budgets on IT, this debate holds a prominent position in business and information technology theory.

CIO Insight notes that the increasing depth and width of IT-business relationships has led to the emergence of IT executives from the corporate structure. Whereas IT executives typically rose from within their technology departments, the need for business-minded CIO's and CTO's has created a demand for leaders versed in corporate strategy. Business theory suggests that this trend will continue as IT moves into the realm of strategic planning.

== Forum on World Class IT podcast ==
IT professionals are increasingly looking to congregate around social media as a forum to raise awareness of the importance of IT-business strategy. Brian Blanchard of CIO Magazine notes that CIOs turn to social media not only to share their own innovative ideas, but also to follow industry trends and form valuable connections.

In an effort to expand the discussion surrounding IT-business relationships, prominent IT professionals participate in a series of informational podcast interviews based on the five principles outlined in World Class IT. The discussions are conducted by Peter High and the over 400 interviews are made available on iTunes and other forums such as Technovation with Peter High (formerly The Forum on World Class IT).

== Reviews ==
IT Business Edge published a review and excerpt of the book.

== Related work by the author ==
The author Peter High has followed up the publishing of his book with numerous pieces on related World Class IT topics. Some of those include the following titles:

- "How CIOs at Microsoft and Cisco Realigned IT For A New Era"
- "CIOs Can Be Chief Innovation Officers, Too"
- "Inside Qualcomm's Integrated IT Infrastructure"
- "Ameristar Casino CIO Sheleen Quish featured in 'Should the CIO Run HR, Too?'"
- "McKesson's Randy Spratt: Where IT Nirvana Meets Business Nirvana"
- "Great American Insurance CIO Piyush Singh: Taking Calculated Risks"
- "The New Normal: Proceed With Caution"
- "The New CIO's First Steps"
- "ADP: IT Innovation in Hard Times Pays Off"
- "Flextronics: Keeping IT Running on 'Just Enough'"
- "World Class IT: The best CIOs are full partners in driving and executing business strategy"

== See also ==
- Digital nervous system
- Information technology
- Project portfolio management

== Sources ==
- High, Peter A. (2009). World Class IT: Why Businesses Succeed When IT Triumphs. San Francisco: Jossey-Bass. ISBN 978-0-470-45018-5.
