= Business @ the Speed of Thought =

1999 book

- Author: Bill Gates; Collins Hemingway
- Genre: Non-fiction

Business @ the Speed of Thought is a book written by Bill Gates and Collins Hemingway in 1999. It discusses how business and technology are integrated, and explains how digital infrastructures and information networks can help someone get an edge on the competition.

Gates asserts cyberspace and industry can no longer be separate entities, and that businesses must change to succeed in the Information Age. Though the book is not a technology handbook it gives insights on how to integrate business process with technology. It explains how advances in networking and information technology can make a difference in day-to-day business.

This book is addressed to those business entrepreneurs or business owners who don't want to stop on the achieved results but prefer to use new technologies for their business, to bring it to automatic mode to run continuously without any extra effort.

== See also ==
- The Road Ahead
- Digital Nervous System
