= Arthur Rubinfeld =

American businessman

Arthur Irwin Rubinfeld
- Born: Arthur Irwin Rubinfeld; New York, New York, U.S.
- Education: University of Colorado
- Occupation: Founder of AIRVISION

Arthur Rubinfeld is a former Starbucks Coffee Chief Creative Officer and President of Global Innovation and Starbucks Reserve, and is the founder of Airvision. He has been recognized by Business Week as one of the top "Candidates for the Corner Office" in their "CEOs of Tomorrow.".

== Biography ==
Rubinfeld holds a Bachelor of Environmental Design and a Master of Architecture from the University of Colorado. He completed the executive program in finance and accounting from the University of Washington.

=== Starbucks ===
As an executive he helped build the Seattle-based Starbucks Coffee. Most recently he was President, Starbucks Coffee - Innovation, Chief Creative Officer and Operational Lead of Starbucks Reserve Roasteries. Rubinfeld joined in 1992 and expanded the company worldwide until his departure in 2002. During that time, recognized as one of Starbucks' most important development periods, Rubinfeld was Senior Vice President of Real Estate and Store Development. In January 2000, he was named Executive Vice President of the Starbucks Corporation.

=== Airvision ===
Rubinfeld founded Airvision, an advisory firm that focuses on retail positioning and brand development, in 2002. Airvision "ideates, creates and executes growth strategies for multiple retail channel development. This includes retail stores, web and catalogue in industries ranging from all categories of retail, restaurant/food service, financial services, and manufacturing."

== Publications ==
In 2005, Prentice Hall/Wharton School Publishing published Rubinfeld's book with Collins Hemingway titled Built for Growth - Expanding Your Business Around the Corner or Across the Globe. Published in six languages, the book focuses on his knowledge of effectively developing and expanding businesses.
