= WE Communications =

Public relations and integrated marketing communications firm

We. Communications
- We. Communications
- Type: Private
- Founded: 1983; 43 years ago
- Headquarters: Seattle
- Number of locations: 23 cities
- Key people: Melissa Waggener Zorkin, Global CEO
- Revenue: $126.6 million (2018)
- Number of employees: 1400+
- Website: https://www.wecommunications.com

We. Communications is a global communications and public relations firm. It was previously known as Waggener Edstrom, then WE Communications, and is now We. Communications. The firm was founded in 1983 by Melissa Waggener Zorkin in Portland, Oregon. Microsoft has been a client of the agency since its early years.

== History ==
The Waggener Group was founded in 1983 by Melissa Waggener Zorkin. In 1984, Pam Edstrom joined the firm, and was renamed Waggener Edstrom. Edstrom previously worked for Microsoft, which became one of the agency's first clients.

In 2018, the firm acquired a majority stake in the Indian public-relations firm Avian Media, and merged its existing Indian operations with the company to form Avian WE. The firm acquired Codeword in 2019. In 2022, We. Communications acquired Hopscotch Consulting, a social impact and behavior change agency. In July 2025, Hopscotch was integrated into We. Communications as the company's social-impact division.

In March 2025, the company re-branded from WE Communications to We. Communications and unveiled a new logo to make the brand feel "more human, unified and aligned".

== Services ==
We. Communications focuses on communications expertise in health, consumer, industries, foundations and non-profits, and technology. Its services include media relations, corporate and executive communications, digital marketing, creative, social media and content strategy, crisis communications, insights and analytics, corporate social responsibility, brand purpose and reputation.

== Notable clients and campaigns ==
Notable clients include Microsoft, Volvo, Boehringer Ingelheim, VSP, Honeywell, Tencent, Cisco, McDonald's, Tabula Rasa, Brother, Amgen, Gilead, iRobot, RSA, Lenovo, the Bill & Melinda Gates Foundation, AT&T and others.

We. Communications is often associated with its work for Microsoft, one of its first clients. In the firm's early years, this relationship led to it working primarily with other technology companies, before expanding into healthcare, consumer and other expertise. For more than a decade, We. Communications supported Mercy Corps on a pro-bono basis after CEO Waggener Zorkin took on the client after visiting the Good Shepherd orphanage in Ghana.

In 2018, We. Communications handled the PR for the McDelivery Day 2.0 and was shortlisted for PRWeek Global Award.
