= Digital nervous system =

IT metaphor

Digital nervous system is a phrase, popularly associated with Bill Gates of Microsoft, used to describe a vision for how the IT infrastructure of an enterprise could be analogous to the autonomic nervous system of a biological organism.

Gates made extensive use of the term in his 1999 book Business @ the Speed of Thought. The actual phrase digital nervous system may not have originated with Gates however, as it has been reported that Judith Dayhoff used the term before Gates did.

Steve Ballmer attempted to explain the digital nervous system by saying the following:

If you think of the human body, what does our nervous system let us do? It lets us hear, see, take input. It lets us think and analyze and plan. It lets us make decisions and communicate and take action. Every company essentially has a nervous system: companies take inputs, they think, they plan, they communicate, they take action. The question is how does the nervous system in your company operate? Is the IT infrastructure really adding value?

Gates himself offered the following explanation as part of a keynote speech at Microsoft's Second Annual CEO Summit in 1998.

The analogy, of course, is to the biological nervous system where you always have the information you need. You always are alert to the most important things, and you block out the information that's not important. And companies really need to have that same kind of thing: the information that's valuable getting to the people who need to know about it.

Digital nervous system has also been described as being synonymous with the term 'Zero Latency Enterprise', another phrase representing the way an enterprise uses IT systems to rapidly communicate between customers, employees and trading partners.
