= 1912 Manchester North West by-election =

UK parliamentary by-election

1912 Manchester North West
← Dec. 1910	8 August 1912	1918 →

Candidate	John Randles	Gordon Hewart
Party	Unionist	Liberal
Popular vote	5,573	4,371
Percentage	56.0%	44.0%
MP before election
George Kemp
Liberal
Subsequent MP
John Randles
Unionist

The 1912 Manchester North West by-election was a Parliamentary by-election held on 8 August 1912. It returned one Member of Parliament (MP) to the House of Commons of the United Kingdom, elected by the first past the post voting system.

== Vacancy ==
Sir George Kemp had been Liberal MP for the seat of Manchester North West since the January 1910 general elections. He stepped down from the House of Commons in 1912.

== History ==
Kemp

General election December 1910: Manchester North West
Party	Candidate	Votes	%	±%
Liberal	George Kemp	5,559	52.1	−1.4
Conservative	Bonar Law	5,114	47.9	+1.4
Majority		445	4.2	−2.8
Turnout		10,673	89.2	−3.4
Liberal hold		Swing	-1.4	

== Candidates ==
The Liberal candidate was Gordon Hewart, a barrister on the Northern England circuit. He was born in Bury and educated at Manchester Grammar School. The Conservative candidate was Sir John Scurrah Randles, an industrialist in the coal and steel business. He had been MP for Cockermouth until his defeat in December 1910.

== Campaign ==
Some of the prominent issues of the day were the Liberal Government's Insurance Act, German rearmament, and trade tariffs. The Unionist party at the time was divided on the issue of free trade v tariff reform. In the Manchester area, and particularly in the Exchange division which included the Royal Exchange where commercial interests were paramount, there were many Unionists who favoured the continuance of free trade and opposed plans by the Unionist leader Bonar Law to campaign in favour of trade tariffs. The Unionist candidate, Sir John Randles was particularly keen to play down this fiscal divide within Unionist ranks. The Constituency had a large number of Jewish voters who had usually supported the Liberal candidate at election time. A leading Manchester Liberal, Nathan Laski, had been instrumental in securing support for both Winston Churchill and Kemp. However, by 1912 Laski had become upset that the Liberal government had not introduced a naturalisation bill, so decided to remain neutral.

== Result ==
The Unionist Party gained the seat from the Liberal Party.

Manchester North West by-election, 1912
Party	Candidate	Votes	%	±%
Unionist	John Scurrah Randles	5,573	56.0	+8.1
Liberal	Gordon Hewart	4,371	44.0	−8.1
Majority		1,202	12.0	N/A
Turnout		9,944	81.9	−7.3
Registered electors		12,143		
Unionist gain from Liberal		Swing	+8.1	

It was reckoned that the Conservative won about 50% of the Jewish vote rather than about 10% which was more usual.

== Aftermath ==
Gordon Hewart was elected to represent Leicester in 1913. A General Election was due to take place by the end of 1915. By the autumn of 1914, the following candidates had been adopted to contest that election. Unionist: Sir John Scurrah Randles, Due to the outbreak of war, the election never took place. Following boundary changes, Manchester North West was abolished and mainly replaced by Manchester Exchange.

General election 1918: Manchester Exchange
Party		Candidate	Votes	%	±%
C	Unionist	John Scurrah Randles	12,290	69.8	
	Liberal	Arthur Haworth	5,326	30.2	
Majority			6,984	39.6	
Turnout			17,616	51.0	
	Unionist win (new seat)				
C indicates candidate endorsed by the coalition government.
