= Manchester Cheetham =

Parliamentary constituency in the United Kingdom, 1950–1974

- Former borough constituency for the House of Commons

1950–February 1974
- Seats: one
- Created from: Manchester Platting (abol. 1950); Manchester Exchange (continued, small parts of)
- Replaced by: Manchester Central

Manchester Cheetham was a parliamentary constituency in the city of Manchester. It returned one Member of Parliament (MP) to the House of Commons of the Parliament of the United Kingdom, elected by the first past the post system.

The constituency was created for the 1950 general election and abolished for the February 1974 general election.

== Boundaries ==
1950–1955: The County Borough of Manchester wards of Cheetham, Collegiate Church, Collyhurst, Harpurhey, and St. Michael's.

1955–1974: The County Borough of Manchester wards of Cheetham, Collegiate Church, Harpurhey, Hugh Oldham, and Miles Platting.

== Members of Parliament ==
Election	Member	Party
1950	Harold Lever	Labour
Feb 1974	constituency abolished	

== Politics and history of the constituency ==
Founded in 1950 the constituency consistently returned Labour Party MPs to the House of Commons in every election until it was dissolved in boundary changes in 1974. The constituency was represented by Harold Lever for its entire 24-year existence, he received between 58% and 70% of the vote. After 1974 the constituency was replaced by Manchester Central.

== Election results ==
=== Elections in the 1950s ===
General election 1950: Manchester Cheetham
Party	Candidate	Votes	%	±%
Labour	Harold Lever	22,012	58.0	
Conservative	Keith Quas-Cohen	12,181	32.1	
Liberal	Bernard McManus	3,794	10.0	
Majority		9,831	25.9	
Turnout		37,987	79.5	
Labour win (new seat)				

General election 1951: Manchester Cheetham
Party	Candidate	Votes	%	±%
Labour	Harold Lever	22,810	62.3	+4.3
Conservative	Geoffrey W. Singleton	13,802	37.7	+5.6
Majority		9,008	24.6	−1.3
Turnout		36,612	75.9	−3.6
Labour hold		Swing	−0.7	

General election 1955: Manchester Cheetham
Party	Candidate	Votes	%	±%
Labour	Harold Lever	21,721	62.2	−0.1
Conservative	James M. Eayrs	13,190	37.8	+0.1
Majority		8,531	24.4	−0.2
Turnout		34,911	65.7	−10.2
Labour hold		Swing	−0.1	

General election 1959: Manchester Cheetham
Party	Candidate	Votes	%	±%
Labour	Harold Lever	20,941	64.3	+2.1
Conservative	Mary Patricia O'Gara	11,605	35.7	−2.1
Majority		9,336	28.6	+4.2
Turnout		32,546	69.0	+3.3
Labour hold		Swing		

=== Elections in the 1960s ===
General election 1964: Manchester Cheetham
Party	Candidate	Votes	%	±%
Labour	Harold Lever	16,046	66.3	+2.0
Conservative	John H. Tresman	8,163	33.7	−2.0
Majority		7,883	32.6	+4.0
Turnout		24,209	60.1	−8.9
Labour hold		Swing		

General election 1966: Manchester Cheetham
Party	Candidate	Votes	%	±%
Labour	Harold Lever	14,206	70.9	+4.6
Conservative	Arthur A. O'Connor	5,844	29.2	−4.5
Majority		8,362	41.7	+9.1
Turnout		20,050	57.0	−4.1
Labour hold		Swing	+4.6	

=== Elections in the 1970s ===
General election 1970: Manchester Cheetham
Party	Candidate	Votes	%	±%
Labour	Harold Lever	10,912	64.1	−6.8
Conservative	Tom Arnold	6,110	35.9	+6.7
Majority		4,802	28.2	+13.5
Turnout		17,022	55.8	−1.2
Labour hold		Swing	−6.8	
