= Edward Fielden (politician) =

British businessman and Conservative Party politician (1857 – 1942)

Edward Brocklehurst Fielden (10 June 1857 – 31 March 1942) was a British businessman and Conservative Party politician.

== Family background ==
He was second son of Joshua Fielden, brother of Thomas Fielden, and grandson of John Fielden of Todmorden, who were all members of parliament.

== Education and business career ==
Fielden was educated at Wellington College and in France. He trained as a civil engineer, becoming an Associate Member of the Institution of Civil Engineers and employed by the Thames Conservancy in Oxfordshire.

He was later a director of the Lancashire and Yorkshire Railway, serving as chairman of its board of directors from 1919 to 1923, when it was absorbed into the London, Midland and Scottish Railway, of which he became subsequently deputy-chairman. He was also chairman of the local board of directors of the Alliance Insurance Company at Shrewsbury.

== Political career and public offices ==
He was elected at the 1900 general election as Member of Parliament (MP) for the Middleton division of Lancashire, which was previously held by his brother Thomas, but did not defend the seat at the 1906 general election. He did not stand for Parliament again until the 1924 general election, when he was elected as MP for the Exchange division of Manchester. He was re-elected in 1929 and 1931, and held the seat until he stood down from the House of Commons at the 1935 general election when he was then, at 78, the oldest MP.

He was a JP for Oxfordshire and Shropshire, becoming High Sheriff of the latter county in 1911. He was elected a member of Shropshire County Council in 1916, becoming a County Alderman in 1927, and was chairman of its finance committee from 1920 to 1940. He served as treasurer of the Royal Salop Infirmary in Shrewsbury in 1918.

He was also a member of the House of Laity in the Church of England Church Assembly.

== Sport ==
Fielden was Master of Fox Hounds of the South Oxfordshire Hunt from 1887 to 1894.

== Personal life ==
Fielden was twice married. He married firstly, in 1884, Mary Ellen Knowles, a daughter of Thomas Knowles of Darn Hall, Cheshire, who was MP for Wigan, by whom he had three sons and one daughter. She died in London on 31 May 1902. He married secondly, in 1906, Mysie, daughter of William Theed. The latter predeceased her husband by three weeks in 1942.

For much of his life he kept a family base, within his earlier constituency's area, at Dobroyd Castle in Todmorden, but was also variously a landowner in Oxfordshire and Shropshire. In 1885, possibly helped by his marriage into a family with a coalowning fortune, he purchased Bury Knowle House at Headington, Oxford, renaming the house "Brocklehurst" (presumably in memory of his mother Ellen Brocklehurst). In 1894 he moved into Shropshire by renting Longford Hall, near Newport, before buying the Condover Hall estate near Shrewsbury in 1897, which he sold in 1926 on moving to Court of Hill near Ludlow. He died at Court of Hill, aged 84, in 1942, and was buried at the parish church of St John the Baptist at Nash.

Parliament of the United Kingdom
Preceded by James Duckworth	Member of Parliament for Middleton; 1900–1906	Succeeded by Ryland Adkins
Preceded by Robert Noton Barclay	Member of Parliament for Manchester Exchange; 1924–1935	Succeeded by Peter Eckersley
Preceded by Samuel Samuel	Oldest Member of Parliament; 1934–1935	Succeeded by Will Thorne
