= Thomas Ackroyd =

English politician (1861–1946)

Thomas Raven Ackroyd
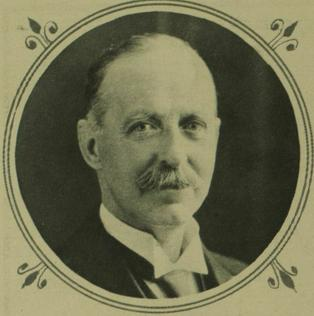

Member of Parliament for Manchester Moss Side
- In office 6 December 1923 – 9 October 1924
- Preceded by: Gerald Hurst
- Succeeded by: Gerald Hurst

Personal details
- Born: 7 August 1861
- Died: 26 April 1946 (aged 84)
- Party: Liberal
- Education: Manchester University
- Occupation: Banker
- Spouse: Emily Woffenden (m. 1893)
- Children: 1 son

Thomas Raven Ackroyd (7 August 1861 – 26 April 1946) was an English bank manager and Liberal Party politician.

== Family and education ==
Ackroyd was the son of William and Elizabeth Ackroyd. He attended Chancery Lane, the Wesleyan School in Manchester, and the Manchester Mechanics’ Institute. He attended Manchester University as an evening student. Later in life, he was awarded the honorary degree of MA from Manchester. He married Emily Woffenden in 1893. They had at least one son, Charles Winstanley Ackroyd, born in 1894, who emigrated to Australia in 1916 and served in the armed forces before being killed in action in October 1917. In religion, Ackroyd was a prominent member of the Wesleyan Methodist Church and acted as a lay preacher.

== Career ==
Ackroyd went into banking. In 1878, he entered service as a junior clerk at the Union Bank of Manchester. He ended up as a bank manager. He also served as a Justice of the Peace. He retired from banking to devote himself to social and educational work on behalf of neglected children.

== Politics and public life ==
=== Public life ===
Ackroyd took an active part in the religious and social life of the city of Manchester. He was Chairman of the Manchester and Salford Ragged School Union and Chairman (for 1924) of the Shaftesbury Society, founded by Lord Shaftesbury, and of the London Ragged School Union. Ackroyd also served for a time as chairman of the executive committee of the Lancashire and Cheshire YMCA.

=== Local and regional politics ===
Ackroyd was also involved in Manchester politics, being a member and later an Alderman of the City Council. He also acted as a representative for Lancashire and Cheshire on the National Liberal Federation.

=== Parliament ===
He first stood for Parliament at the 1922 general election as a Liberal candidate in Manchester's Moss Side. He came second to the sitting Conservative MP, Gerald Berkeley Hurst, in a three-cornered contest, with Labour’s T. W. Mercer in third.

He was again the candidate in 1923, when the Liberal reunion improved his prospects. This time Labour did not intervene, and, although there was an independent candidate (who lost his deposit), Ackroyd took the seat from Hurst with a majority of 3,113 votes.

By 1924, however, the Tory Party had revived, and in a straight fight with Hurst, Ackroyd lost his seat by a majority of 4,009. He tried to regain the seat in 1929, but in a three-cornered contest with Hurst and Labour candidate A. A. Purcell, he came third. He did not attempt to re-enter the House of Commons again.

== Death ==
Ackroyd died on 26 April 1946 at the age of 84 years.

Parliament of the United Kingdom
Preceded by Gerald Berkeley Hurst	Member of Parliament for Manchester Moss Side; 1923 – 1924	Succeeded by Gerald Berkeley Hurst
