= William Duckworth (British politician) =

British politician (1879–1952)

William Rostron Duckworth (24 November 1879 – 14 July 1952) was a British Conservative Party politician. He was the Member of Parliament (MP) for Manchester Moss Side from 1935 to 1945.

Parliament of the United Kingdom
Preceded by Gerald Berkeley Hurst	Member of Parliament for Manchester Moss Side; 1935 – 1945	Succeeded by William Griffiths
