= Edwin Stockton =

British industrialist and Conservative MP

Sir Edwin Forsyth Stockton (18 March 1873 – 4 December 1939) was a British industrialist and Conservative MP for Manchester Exchange. He won the seat in 1922, but lost it to the Liberals in 1923.

Stockton was a member of the Cotton Control Board from 1916 to 1919.

== Sources ==
- Craig, F. W. S. (1983) [1969]. British parliamentary election results 1918-1949 (3rd ed.). Chichester: Parliamentary Research Services. ISBN 0-900178-06-X., p. 187
- Whitaker's Almanack, 1923 and 1923 editions

Parliament of the United Kingdom
Preceded by John Randles	Member of Parliament for Manchester Exchange; 1922–1923	Succeeded by Robert Noton Barclay
