= Manchester North West =

Former UK parliamentary constituency

- Former borough constituency for the House of Commons

1885–1918
- Seats: one
- Created from: Manchester
- Replaced by: Manchester Ardwick, Manchester Blackley, Manchester Exchange, Manchester Moss Side

Manchester North West was one of six single-member Parliamentary constituencies created in 1885 by the division of the three-member Parliamentary Borough of Manchester under the Redistribution of Seats Act 1885. Its first MP, William Houldsworth, had previously sat for Manchester. It was abolished in 1918.

Winston Churchill won the seat at the 1906 general election, but lost it at the 1908 by-election required at that time on his promotion to the Cabinet (he instead returned to Parliament for Dundee). In 1910, Bonar Law challenged Churchill to stand against him here, and promised "he would welcome him and they would have a lively time". Bonar Law suggested that the loser should stay out of the next parliament (The Times). Churchill declined. In the event Bonar Law lost to the sitting MP, Sir George Kemp.

Kemp resigned the seat in July 1912, ostensibly to concentrate on his business interests, but he was known to disagree with the Home Rule Bill (The Times).

== Boundaries ==
The Municipal Borough of Manchester wards of Collegiate, Exchange, Oxford, St Ann's, St Clement's, St James's, and St John's, and the civil parish of Cheetham.

== Members of Parliament ==
Election	Member	Party
1885	William Houldsworth	Conservative
1906	Winston Churchill	Liberal
1908 by-election	William Joynson-Hicks	Conservative
1910	Sir George Kemp	Liberal
1912 by-election	Sir John Randles	Conservative
1918	Constituency abolished	

== Elections ==
Decades:	1880s; 1890s; 1900s; 1910s

=== Elections in the 1880s ===
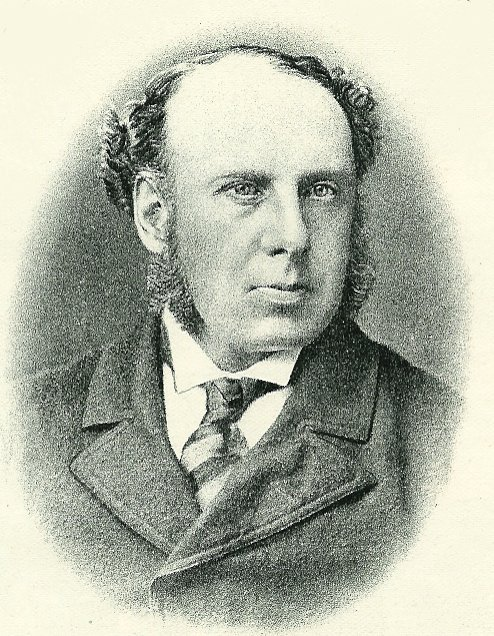
Houldsworth

General election 1885: Manchester North West
Party	Candidate	Votes	%	±%
Conservative	William Houldsworth	5,834	53.3	
Liberal	John Slagg	5,111	46.7	
Majority		723	6.6	
Turnout		10,945	86.3	
Registered electors		12,685		
Conservative win (new seat)				

General election 1886: Manchester North West
Party	Candidate	Votes	%	±%
Conservative	William Houldsworth	5,489	55.2	+1.9
Liberal	Henry Lee	4,453	44.8	−1.9
Majority		1,036	10.4	+3.8
Turnout		9,942	78.4	−7.9
Registered electors		12,685		
Conservative hold		Swing	+1.9	

=== Elections in the 1890s ===
General election 1892: Manchester North West
Party	Candidate	Votes	%	±%
Conservative	William Houldsworth	Unopposed		
Conservative hold				

General election 1895: Manchester North West
Party	Candidate	Votes	%	±%
Conservative	William Houldsworth	4,997	58.6	N/A
Liberal	Thomas Francis Byrne	3,526	41.4	New
Majority		1,471	17.2	N/A
Turnout		8,523	72.6	N/A
Registered electors		11,741		
Conservative hold				

=== Elections in the 1900s ===
General election 1900: Manchester North West
Party	Candidate	Votes	%	±%
Conservative	William Houldsworth	Unopposed		
Conservative hold				

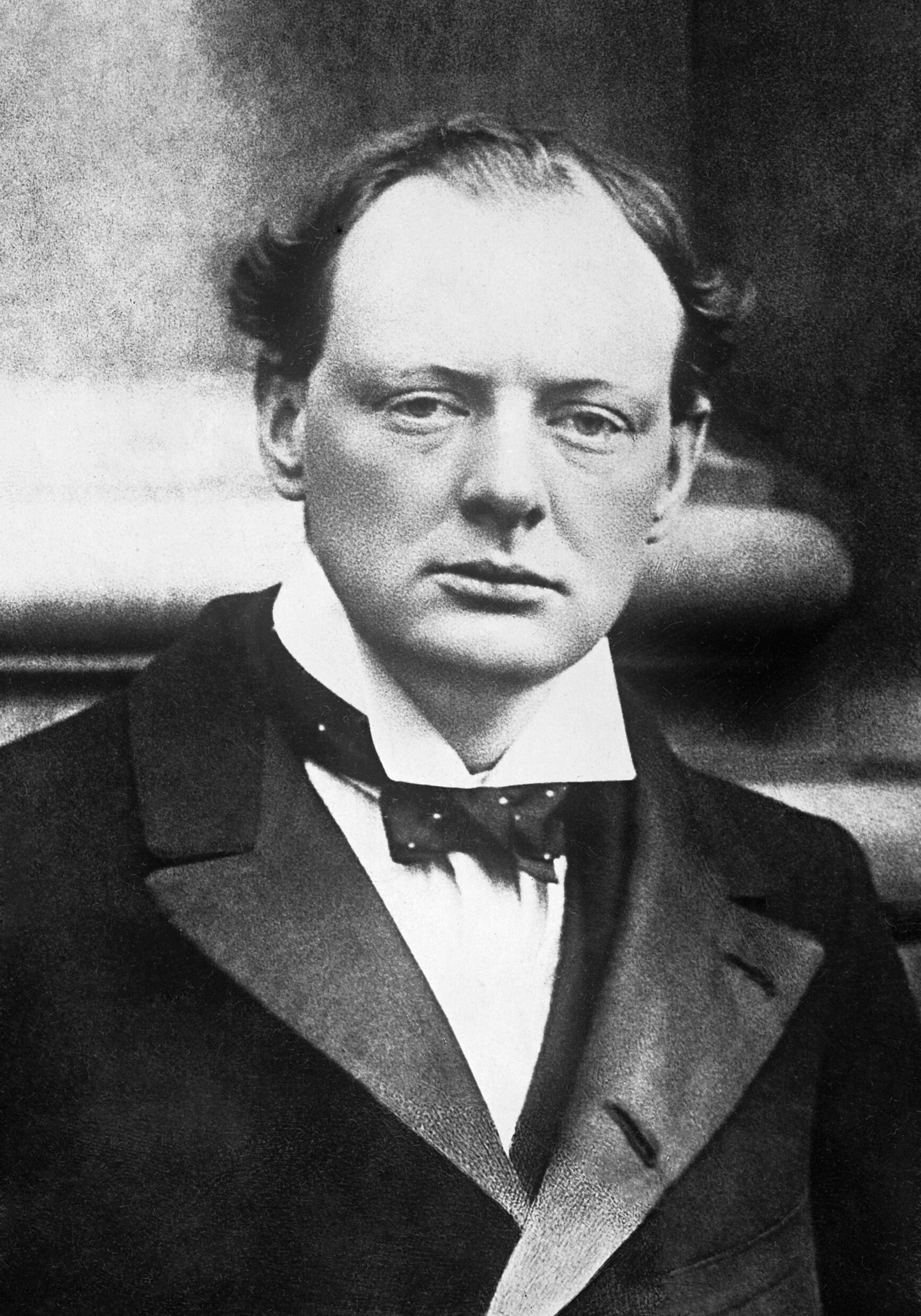
Churchill

General election 1906: Manchester North West
Party	Candidate	Votes	%	±%
Liberal	Winston Churchill	5,639	56.2	New
Conservative	William Joynson-Hicks	4,398	43.8	N/A
Majority		1,241	12.4	N/A
Turnout		10,037	88.0	N/A
Registered electors		11,411		
Liberal gain from Conservative		Swing	N/A	

1908 Manchester North West by-election
Party	Candidate	Votes	%	±%
Conservative	William Joynson-Hicks	5,417	50.7	+6.9
Liberal	Winston Churchill	4,988	46.7	−9.5
Social Democratic Federation	Dan Irving	276	2.6	New
Majority		429	4.0	N/A
Turnout		10,681	89.7	+1.7
Registered electors		11,914		
Conservative gain from Liberal		Swing	+8.2	

=== Elections in the 1910s ===
Kemp

General election January 1910: Manchester North West
Party	Candidate	Votes	%	±%
Liberal	George Kemp	5,930	53.5	+6.8
Conservative	William Joynson-Hicks	5,147	46.5	−4.2
Majority		783	7.0	N/A
Turnout		11,077	92.6	+2.9
Liberal gain from Conservative		Swing	+5.5	

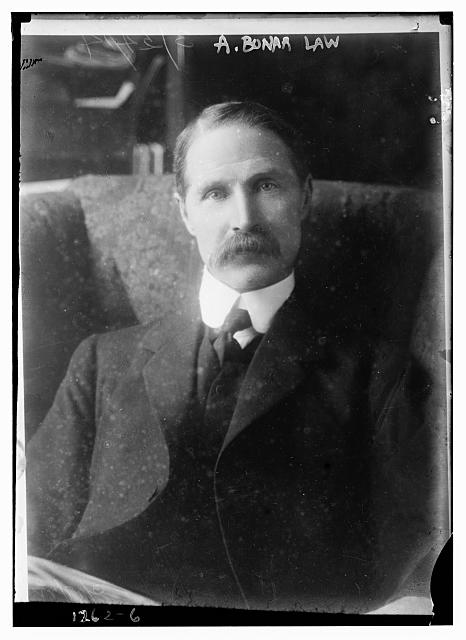
Law

General election December 1910: Manchester North West
Party	Candidate	Votes	%	±%
Liberal	George Kemp	5,559	52.1	−1.4
Conservative	Bonar Law	5,114	47.9	+1.4
Majority		445	4.2	−2.8
Turnout		10,673	89.2	−3.4
Liberal hold		Swing	-1.4	

1912 Manchester North West by-election
Party	Candidate	Votes	%	±%
Conservative	John Randles	5,573	56.0	+8.1
Liberal	Gordon Hewart	4,371	44.0	−8.1
Majority		1,202	12.0	N/A
Turnout		9,944	81.9	−7.3
Registered electors		12,143		
Unionist gain from Liberal		Swing	+8.1	

General Election 1914–15:

Another General Election was required to take place before the end of 1915. The political parties had been making preparations for an election to take place and by July 1914, the following candidates had been selected;

- Unionist: John Randles
- Liberal: John Simon

== Sources ==
Election Results:

- https://web.archive.org/web/20060520143104/http://www.manchester.gov.uk/elections/archive/gen1900.htm
- https://web.archive.org/web/20060520143047/http://www.manchester.gov.uk/elections/archive/gen1945.htm

Dan Irving:

- http://debs.indstate.edu/s6883s63_1911.pdf
- https://web.archive.org/web/20040828173431/http://www.modjourn.brown.edu/mjp/NAVall/Nav2/NAV0226.pdf

Bonar Law versus Churchill:

- "The Manchester Contest", The Times, 29 November 1910. Retrieved online 21 March 2006.

Resignation of Kemp:

- "Another by-election", The Times, 26 July 1912. Retrieved online 22 March 2006.
