= John Randles =

British politician (1857–1945)

Knight Sir John Scurrah Randles
- John Randles
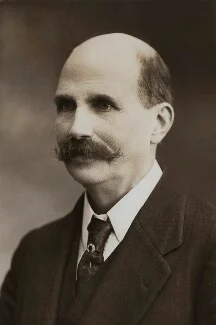
- Randles in 1918
- Born: 25 December 1857; Boston, Lincolnshire, England
- Died: February 1945 (aged 87); Keswick, England
- Resting place: Castlehead Wood, Keswick, England; 30U E 491385 N 6049629
- Citizenship: British
- Education: Woodhouse Grove School in Lincolnshire
- Organization: A member of the executive of the National Trust
- Known for: British businessman and Conservative politician.
- Other political affiliations: Cockermouth; Manchester North West; Manchester Exchange
- Partner: Elizabeth Hartley
- Parents: Rev. Marshall Randles (father); Sarah Dewhurst (mother)
- Awards: Insignia Commander of the Order of the Crown; The Insignia of the Second Class of the Order of the Rising Sun
- Honours: Knight

Sir John Scurrah Randles (25 December 1857 – 11 February 1945) was a British businessman and Conservative politician. He was knighted in 1905 by King Edward VII, King of the United Kingdom (1841–1910).

== Biography ==
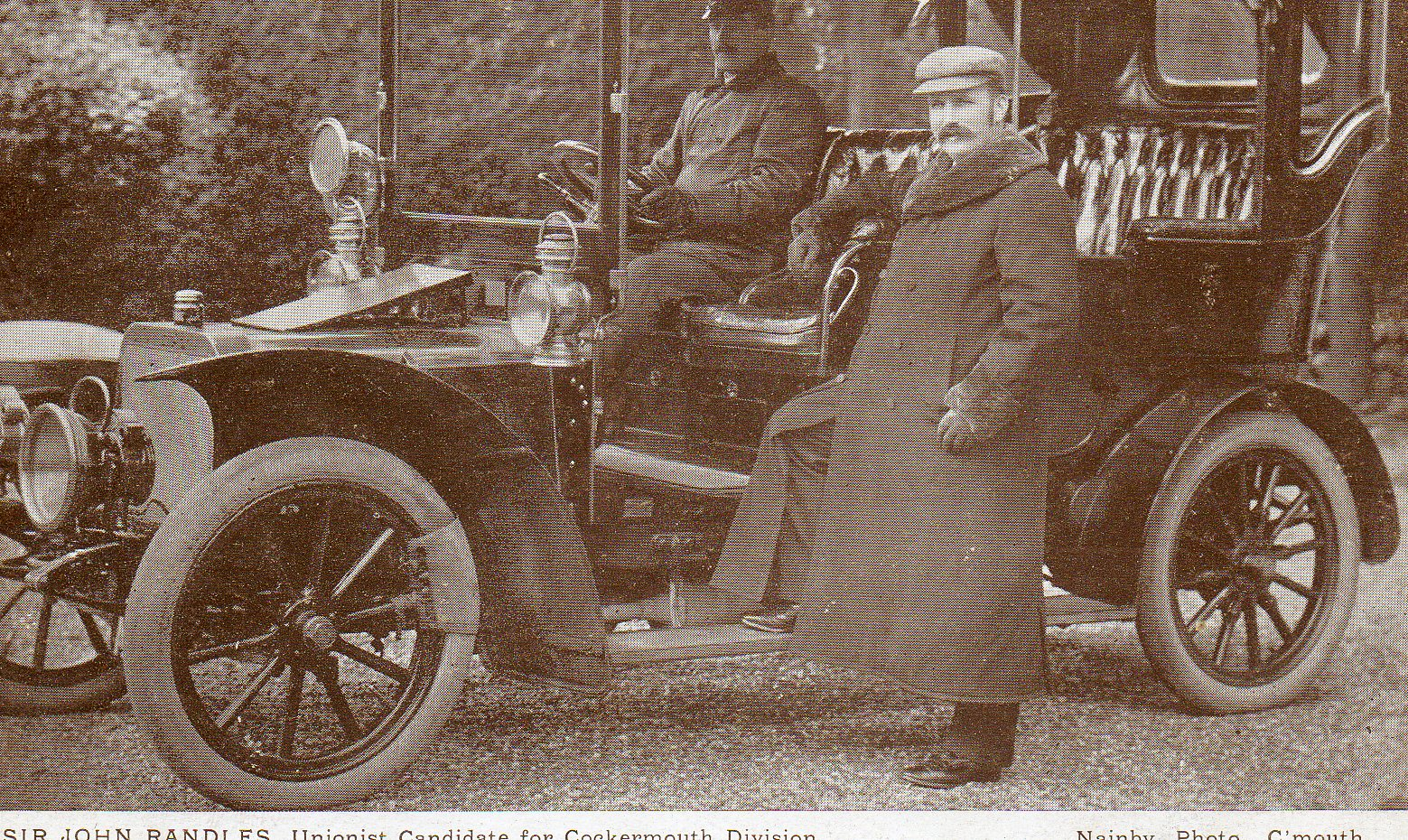
Sir John Randles English Politician

John Scurrah Randles was born on Christmas Day, 25 December 1857 in Boston, Lincolnshire, the son of a Wesleyan minister, Rev. Marshall Randles D.D (1826–1904) and Sarah Dewhurst. He was educated at the Woodhouse Grove School in Lincolnshire and lived at Bristowe Hill, Keswick, Cumbria. In 1883 Randles married Elizabeth Hartley (? - 1853). An industrialist in the coal and steel business, amongst his positions he was the chairman and managing director of the Moss Bay Hematite Iron and Steel Company and a director of the Workington Iron and the Beckermet Mining Companies. Randles was elected Member of Parliament for Cockermouth in the 1900 general election.

He lost the seat in the 1906 election, but regained it in a by-election later the same year. Defeated in the December 1910 election, he won Manchester North West in a 1912 by-election, and when the constituency was abolished, held Manchester Exchange until 1922, when he retired following the takeover by United Steel Companies of his Workington Iron and Steel Company.

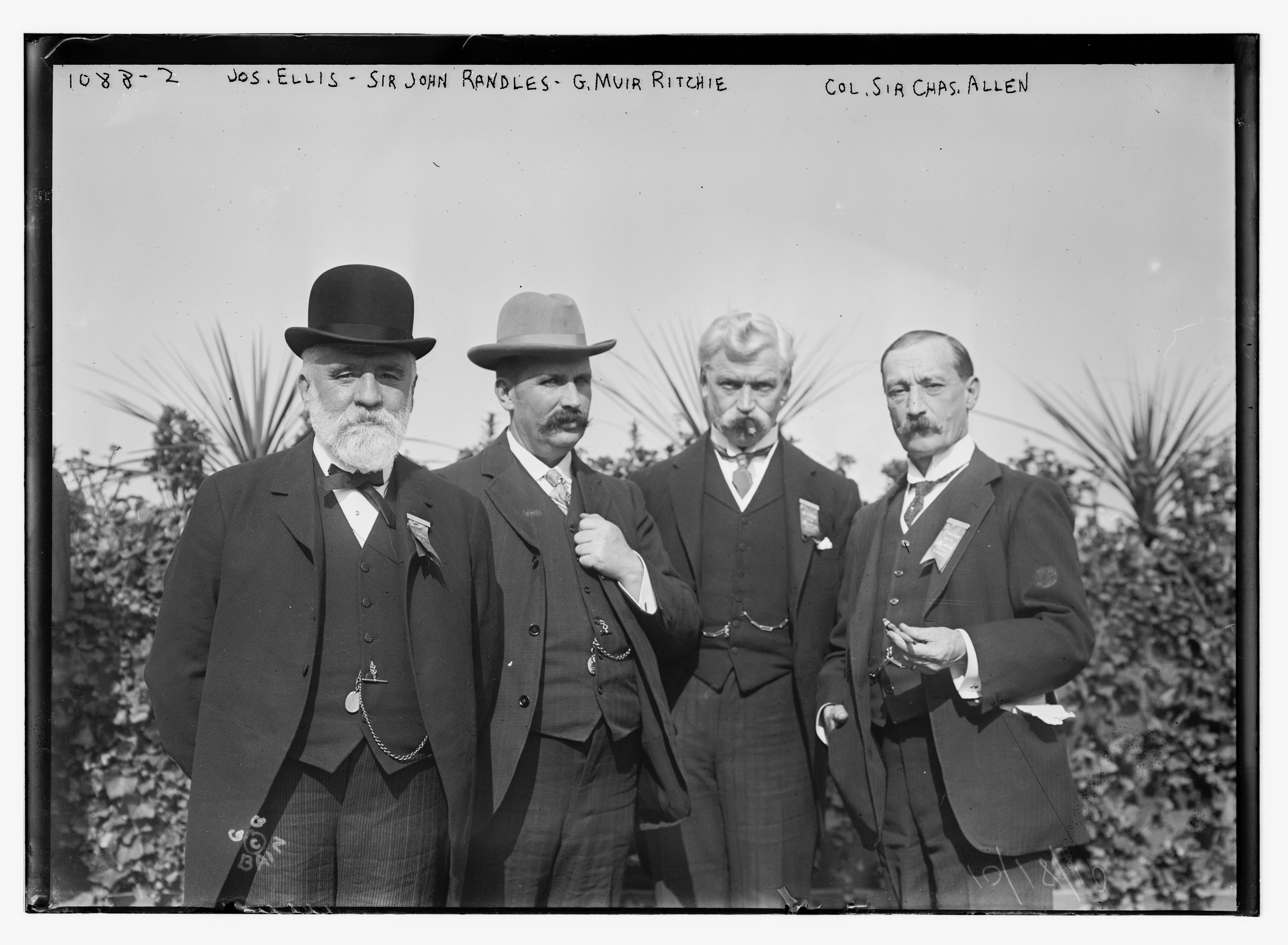
Jos. Ellis, Sir John Randles (2nd person from the left), G. Muir Ritchie, and Col. Sir Chas. Allen is standing outside.

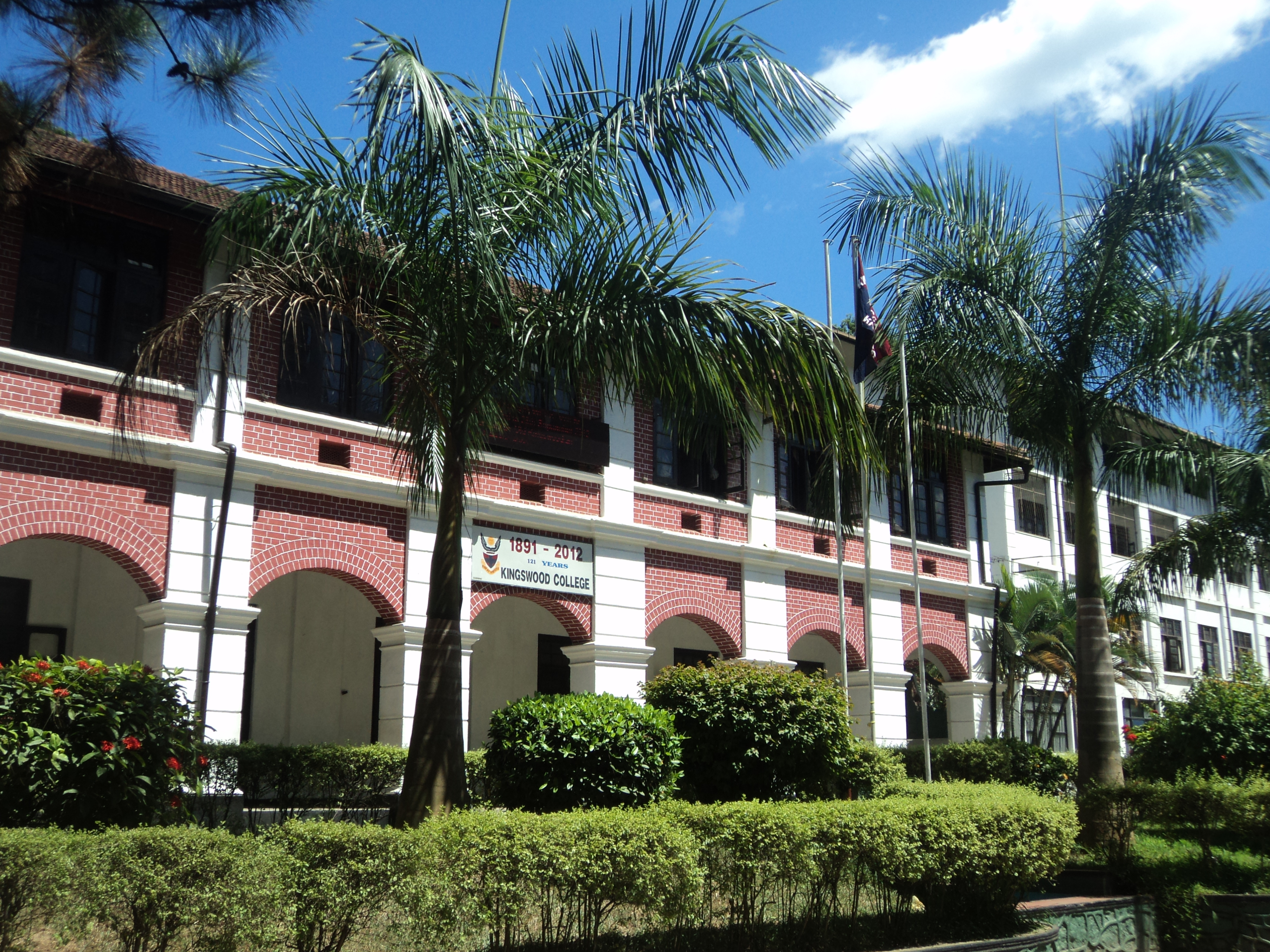
Kingswood College, Kandy

Randles was knighted in 1905. A member of the executive of the National Trust, he gave land on the shores of Derwentwater to the Trust. He was also a member of Cumberland County Council and was active in setting up the Workington Technical College. He funded an operating theatre in his wife's name at Keswick Cottage Hospital. After the First World War, he was awarded the 'Insignia Commander of the Order of the Crown' medal by the King of the Belgians, 1919 and in 1920 Sir John was also awarded The Insignia of the Second Class of the Order of the Rising Sun. Randles donated money to purchase land for the construction of Kingswood College in Kandy, Ceylon. He died at his home in Keswick in February 1945. He was survived by his wife Elizabeth.

Parliament of the United Kingdom
Preceded by Sir Wilfrid Lawson	Member of Parliament for Cockermouth; 1900–1906	Succeeded by Sir Wilfrid Lawson
Preceded by Sir Wilfrid Lawson	Member of Parliament for Cockermouth; 1906–December 1910	Succeeded by Sir Wilfrid Lawson
Preceded by Sir George Kemp	Member of Parliament for Manchester North West; 1912–1918	constituency abolished
New constituency	Member of Parliament for Manchester Exchange; 1918–1922	Succeeded by Sir Edwin Forsyth Stockton
