= Gerald Hurst (politician) =

British politician

Sir Gerald Berkeley Hurst QC (4 December 1877 – 27 October 1957) was a British Conservative Party politician and County Court judge.

Gerald Berkeley Hertz was born in Bradford to Fanny Mary Halle and William Martin Hertz, a wool merchant. His Jewish grandparents on both sides came from Germany in the mid-nineteenth century. He was educated at Bradford Grammar School and Lincoln College, Oxford, where he was a Scholar. He took a first in Modern History in 1898 and his B.C.L. He also gained the Arnold Historical Essay Prize. He was called to the Bar by Lincoln's Inn in 1898, joining the Northern Circuit, and, first in Manchester Chambers, he attached himself to the Chancery Bar of the Palatine Court, at the same time lecturing on constitutional law at Manchester University. He was also a special lecturer there in colonial history and was active in extra-mural work for the university. He took silk in 1920, was made a Bencher of Lincoln's Inn in 1924, and Treasurer in 1944.

Hertz changed the spelling of his surname to Hurst in 1916, explaining in his privately-circulated memoir More Closed Chapters that, "When war came, however, we all found it unbearable to have names which suggest associations with an enemy country, whereas in fact Germany had persecuted our forebears, and was to us simply an object of aversion [...] Hence the happy change to Hurst in August 1916, when I was at home on leave from the East."

He joined the 4th Volunteer Battalion Manchester Regiment in January 1900, which became the 7th Battalion, The Manchester Regiment when the Territorial system was introduced in 1907. He served in the British Army during World War I and was stationed in the Middle East, Gallipoli and France, attaining the rank of Lieutenant-Colonel in command of the Battalion. With Manchesters in the East, his account of the 7th Battalion and their experiences in the Sudan and in the Gallipoli campaign, was published in 1918.

In 1905 he married Margaret Alice, one of the daughters of Alfred Hopkinson, Vice-Chancellor of Manchester University and a Member of Parliament. They had five daughters and one son, Quentin, who was killed in action in Libya in World War II. Their daughter Eve married Frederic Seebohm.

He was the Member of Parliament (MP) for Manchester Moss Side from 1918 to 1923 and from 1924 to 1935. He was a keen supporter of Imperial Preference. A backbencher, he introduced the Cotton Industry Acts of 1923, 1928, and 1933; the Nursing Homes Registration Act; and the Adoption of Children Act, and he took an active part in the debates on the Trades Disputes Bill. He felt keenly about the barbaric forms of field punishment used in the War and certain abuses of the system of courts-martial, about which he wrote articles in the Contemporary Review and he gave evidence before Lord Darling's committee on courts-martial in April 1919. Hurst was knighted in 1929. In November 1937, he was appointed to the county court for Croydon and West Kent and during World War II he served as chairman of several committees concerned with aliens, conscientious objectors, etc. He retired in 1952. His younger brother was Sir Arthur Frederick Hurst.

His memoirs, entitled Closed Chapters, were published in 1942.

Coat of arms of Gerald Hurst
Motto He Giveth Goodly Words

== Works ==
English public opinion after the restoration, 1902, Fisher Unwin

The Old Colonial System, 1905, Longmans

Historical memoirs : an address delivered to the Southport Literary and Philosophical Society, 1906, Southport : “Visiter” Printing Works

British imperialism in the eighteenth century, 1908, London: Constable

The Manchester Politician, 1750-1912, With a preface by Sir Alfred Hopkinson, 1912, London, Manchester: Sherratt & Hughes

With Manchesters in the East, 1918, Manchester University Press

Closed Chapters, 1942, Manchester University Press

A Short History of Lincoln's Inn, 1946, London: Constable

Lincoln's Inn Essays, 1949

Parliament of the United Kingdom
New constituency	Member of Parliament for Manchester Moss Side; 1918 – 1923	Succeeded by Thomas Ackroyd
Preceded by Thomas Ackroyd	Member of Parliament for Manchester Moss Side; 1924 – 1935	Succeeded by William Duckworth
