= 1906 Cockermouth by-election =

UK parliamentary by-election

← 1906	3 August 1906	Jan. 1910 →

Candidate	Randles	Guest	Smillie
Party	Conservative	Liberal	Ind. Labour Party
Popular vote	4,596	3,903	1,436
Percentage	46.2%	39.3%	14.5%
MP before election
Sir Wilfrid Lawson
Liberal
Subsequent MP
John Randles
Conservative

The 1906 Cockermouth by-election was a by-election held on 3 August 1906 for the British House of Commons constituency of Cockermouth.

== Vacancy ==
The by-election was triggered by the death of the town's Liberal Member of Parliament (MP) Sir Wilfrid Lawson.

== Electoral history ==
At the last General Election in January, the result was;

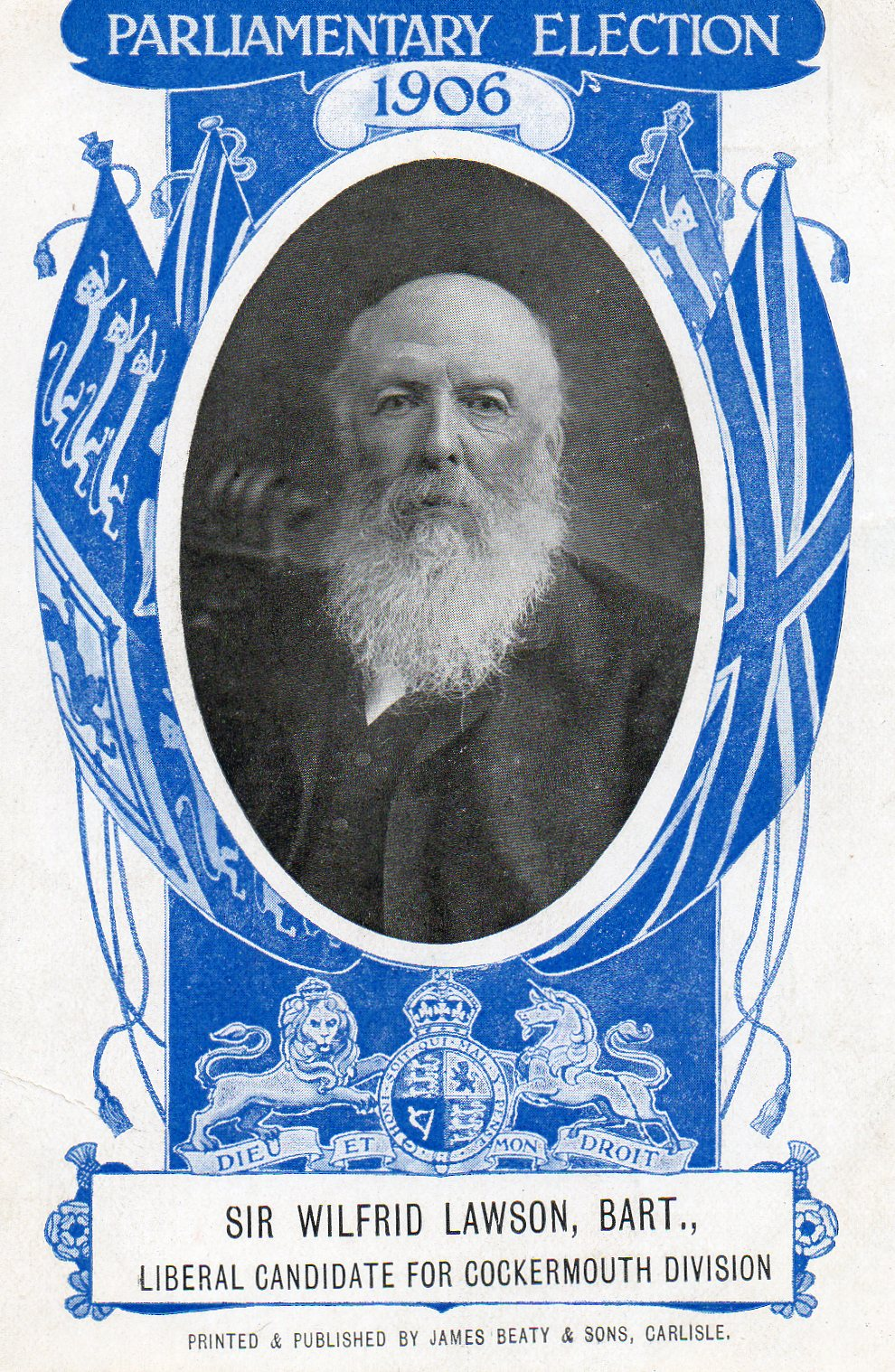

General election 1906 Cockermouth
Party	Candidate	Votes	%	±%
Liberal	Wilfrid Lawson	5,349	52.8	+4.1
Conservative	John Scurrah Randles	4,786	47.2	−4.1
Majority		563	5.6	N/A
Turnout		10,135	86.6	+10.0
Liberal gain from Conservative		Swing	+4.1	

== Candidates ==
The Liberal candidate chosen to defend the seat was Captain Frederick Guest. Thirty-one-year-old Guest was a former Conservative who had followed his cousin Winston Churchill, for whom he worked as private secretary, into the Liberal Party in 1904 in support of the policy of Free trade. At the previous General Election in January, he was Liberal candidate for Kingswinford where he came second.

The Conservative candidate was Sir John Randles, who had held the seat from 1900 until losing narrowly in the general election in January. Forty-eight-year-old Randles was an industrialist in the coal and steel business.

There was also a third candidate, Robert Smillie of the Independent Labour Party. Forty-nine-year-old Smillie, in 1893 was a founding member of the Independent Labour Party. He had been President of the Scottish Miners' Federation since 1894. He had stood unsuccessfully for parliament on a number of occasions since 1894. At the previous General Election in January, he was Labour candidate for Paisley when he came third.

== Campaign ==
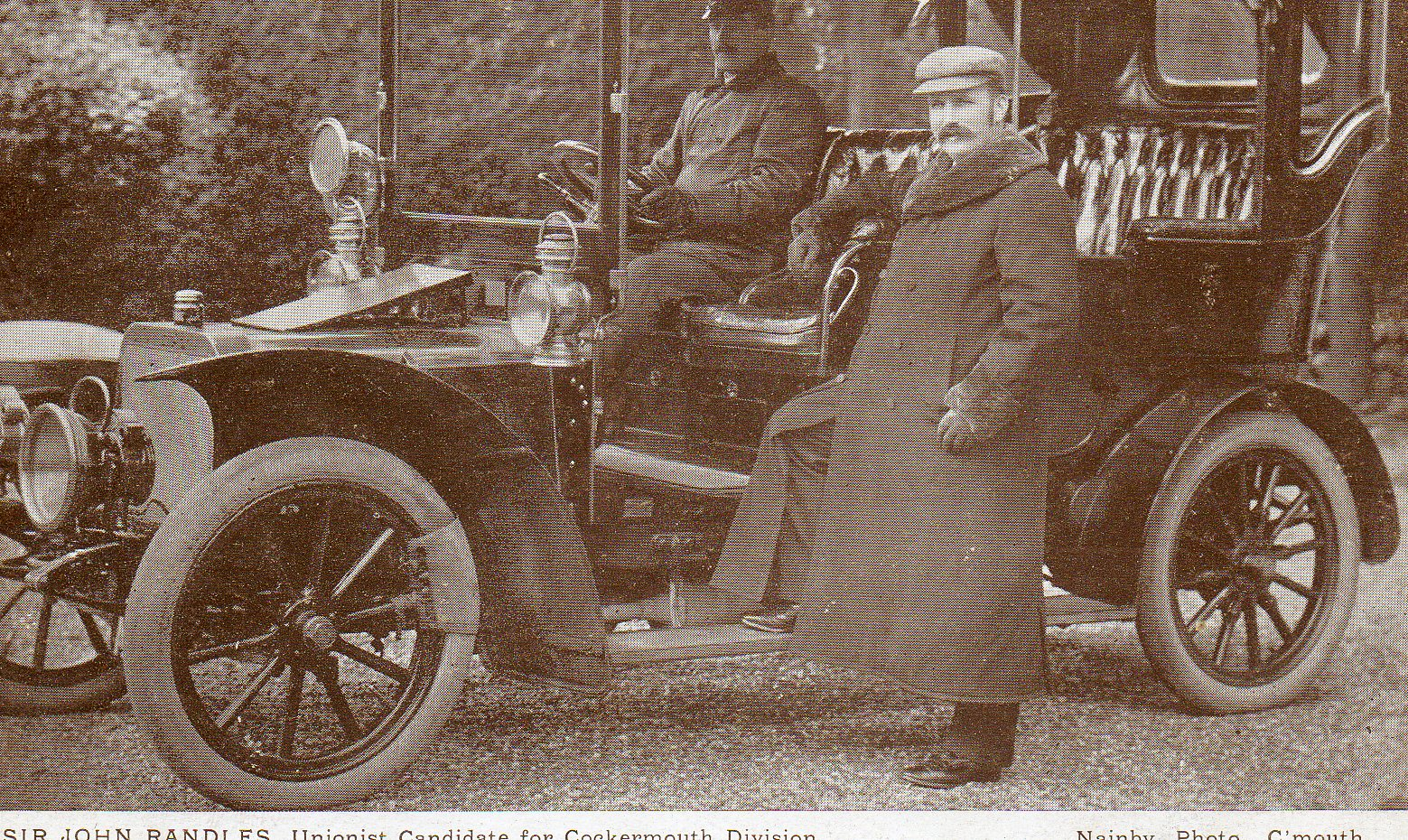
Randles during the campaign

== Result ==
Turnout was only slightly down since the general election, when only two candidates had run, and although the Conservative vote fell slightly, the Liberals lost much more, probably due to the intervention of Smillie. The result was a gain for the Conservatives.

Cockermouth by-election, 1906
Party	Candidate	Votes	%	±%
Conservative	John Scurrah Randles	4,593	46.2	−1.0
Liberal	Frederick Guest	3,903	39.3	−13.5
Ind. Labour Party	Robert Smillie	1,436	14.5	New
Majority		690	6.9	N/A
Turnout		9,932	84.9	−1.7
Conservative gain from Liberal		Swing	+6.2	

== Aftermath ==
Randles held the seat at the following General Election;

General election January 1910 Cockermouth
Party	Candidate	Votes	%	±%
Conservative	John Scurrah Randles	4,579	45.2	−1.0
Liberal	Wilfrid Lawson	3,638	35.9	−3.4
Labour	James Percy Whitehead	1,909	18.9	+4.4
Majority		941	9.3	+2.4
Turnout		10,126	89.4	+4.5
Conservative hold		Swing	+1.2	

Sir John Randles lost the seat again in the December 1910 election, this time to Sir Wilfred Lawson, son of the former MP. Frederick Guest was eventually returned as a Member of Parliament for East Dorset in the January 1910 general election.

== See also ==
- List of United Kingdom by-elections
- Cockermouth constituency
