= Frank Hatton (British politician) =

British politician (1921–1978)

Member of Parliament for Manchester Moss Side
- In office 28 February 1974 – 13 July 1978
- Preceded by: Frank Taylor
- Succeeded by: George Morton

Member of Parliament for Manchester Exchange
- In office 27 June 1973 – 8 February 1974
- Preceded by: William Griffiths
- Succeeded by: Constituency Abolished

Personal details
- Born: 25 September 1921
- Party: Labour

Frank Hatton (25 September 1921 – 16 May 1978) was a Labour Party politician in the United Kingdom.

Hatton was a personnel officer for the Central Electricity Generating Board from 1951 to 1973. He unsuccessfully fought Manchester Moss Side in 1970, but was elected as member of parliament (MP) for Manchester Exchange at a 1973 by-election. When the seat was abolished in boundary changes for the February 1974 general election, Hatton was returned to the House of Commons as MP for Moss Side.

In 1949, Hatton married Olive Kelly, and they had two sons. While in office, he died in Manchester on 16 May 1978, aged 56, following a long illness. His successor in the subsequent by-election was George Morton.

Parliament of the United Kingdom
Preceded by William Griffiths	Member of Parliament for Manchester Exchange; 1973 – Feb 1974	Constituency abolished
Preceded by Frank Taylor	Member of Parliament for Manchester Moss Side; Feb 1974 – 1978	Succeeded by George Morton
