= Peter Eckersley (cricketer) =

Lieutenant (A) Peter Thorp Eckersley MP
- Born: 2 July 1904; Lowton, Lancashire, England
- Died: 13 August 1940 (aged 36) near Eastleigh, Hampshire, England
- Resting place: Tyldesley Cemetery
- Education: Trinity College, Cambridge
- Known for: Cricket
- Spouse: Audrey E. J. Eckersley

Member of Parliament for Manchester Exchange
- In office 14 November 1935 – 13 August 1940
- Preceded by: Edward Fielden
- Succeeded by: Thomas Hewlett

Peter Thorp Eckersley (2 July 1904 – 13 August 1940) was the captain of Lancashire County Cricket Club from 1929 to 1935, who retired for a career as a Conservative Party politician.

== Early life ==
Eckersley was born on 2 July 1904 to William Eckersley CBE and Eva Mary Eclersley (née Thorp) at Lowton in the north west of England. For his education he attended Rugby School, where he played for the first XI in cricket.

== Cricket career ==
=== Lancashire ===
After school he began playing cricket at Leigh Cricket Club before joining Lancashire County Cricket Club in 1923. Eckersley went up to Trinity College, Cambridge, but made his debut for Lancashire against his university on 9 May 1923. Over the course of his first-class cricket career he made 5,629 runs (his record score being 102), scoring 25 fifties, took 141 catches and took seven wickets for 348 runs conceded. His final first-class match took place on 31 August 1938 when he appeared for an England XI against a touring Australian team.

=== Exhibition matches and tours ===
Eckersley was selected for the Marylebone Cricket Club (MCC) 1926/27 tour to India and Ceylon. He played 26 matches on the tour before returning to club cricket with Lancashire in April 1927. He also appeared for The Gentlemen against The Players, against Jamaica for L.H. Tennyson's XI and toured South America with Sir J. Cahn's XI.

=== Post-playing career ===
==== Business ====
He worked in Stockport as a director at a coach building company called G.W. Smith and Co.

==== Politics ====
Having unsuccessfully fought Leigh in 1931, he was elected at the 1935 general election as Member of Parliament (MP) for Manchester Exchange.

== Aviation ==
He and his wife, Audrey E. J. Eckersley, were the Lancashire Aero Club members. He regularly flew himself to cricket matches, becoming known as the 'Flying Cricketer'.

=== Second World War ===
Eckersley joined the Fleet Air Arm and was based at HMS Raven where he was in training. He died on 13 August 1940 in a flying accident near Eastleigh, Hampshire becoming the fourth MP to be killed in World War II. A stained glass window to his memory is in Chowbent Unitarian Chapel in Atherton.

He is buried at Tyldesley Cemetery in the care of the Commonwealth War Graves Commission.

Parliament of the United Kingdom
Preceded by Edward Fielden	Member of Parliament for Manchester Exchange; 1935–1940	Succeeded by Thomas Hewlett
