= 1908 Manchester North West by-election =

By-election in England

- 24 April 1908

	First party	Second party	Third party
Candidate	William Joynson-Hicks	Winston Churchill	Dan Irving
Party	Conservative	Liberal	Social Democratic Federation
Popular vote	5,417	4,988	276
Percentage	50.7%	46.7%	2.6%
Swing	▲6.9%	▼9.5%	New
MP before election
Winston Churchill
Liberal
Elected MP
William Joynson-Hicks
Conservative

The 1908 Manchester North West by-election was a Parliamentary by-election held on 24 April 1908 for the constituency of Manchester North West. The constituency returned one Member of Parliament (MP) to the House of Commons of the United Kingdom, elected by the first past the post voting system.

== Vacancy ==
Winston Churchill had been Liberal MP for the seat of Manchester North West since the 1906 general election when he gained it from the Conservatives. He was obliged to submit to re-election after his appointment as President of the Board of Trade, as the Ministers of the Crown Act required newly appointed Cabinet ministers to re-contest their seats.

== Candidates ==
The local Liberal Association re-selected 34-year-old Winston Churchill to defend his seat. His political career to date was Member of Parliament for Oldham from 1900–1906 (he was elected as a Conservative, but crossed the floor to join the Liberals in 1904), Liberal Member of Parliament for Manchester North West since 1906. When the Liberals came to power he was Under-Secretary of State for the Colonies from 1905–1908, and newly appointed to the Cabinet as President of the Board of Trade.

The Conservatives retained 43-year-old William Joynson-Hicks as their candidate. This was his third election to parliament, having contested neighbouring Manchester North in 1900, losing by 26 votes. He was a London solicitor.

Although there was no Labour Party candidate, the rival Social Democratic Federation parachuted in a 54-year-old Branch Secretary, Dan Irving to contest the seat. Burnley was one of the SDF's strongest branches due to the activities of their leader Henry Hyndman. In 1902, Irving had won election to Burnley Town Council. At the 1906 general election, Irving had contested Accrington finishing a poor third.

== Campaign ==
Polling Day was fixed for the 24 April 1908.

Manchester had been a key battleground at the 1906 general election. It was known to favour Free trade and oppose the protectionist policies of Joseph Chamberlain. Conservative defeats in Manchester in 1906 (including the outgoing Conservative Prime Minister Arthur Balfour, who had lost his seat at Manchester East at that election) were blamed on Tariff reform policies. Many Manchester Conservatives opposed Tariff reform, including Joynson-Hicks. His position helped to neutralise the issue in the by-election and promote local Conservative unity. However, Churchill still received endorsement from the Free Trade League.

Suffragettes harassed Churchill, over his refusal to support legislation that would give women the vote. This opposition was led by the Women's Social and Political Union and suffragettes Constance Markievicz, Eva Gore-Booth, and Esther Roper.

There was Jewish hostility to Joynson-Hicks over his support for the controversial Aliens Act 1905. A number of Roman Catholic priests urged their congregation to vote Conservative after Joynson-Hicks attacked Liberal education policy for undermining the autonomy of Roman Catholic Schools.

== Result ==
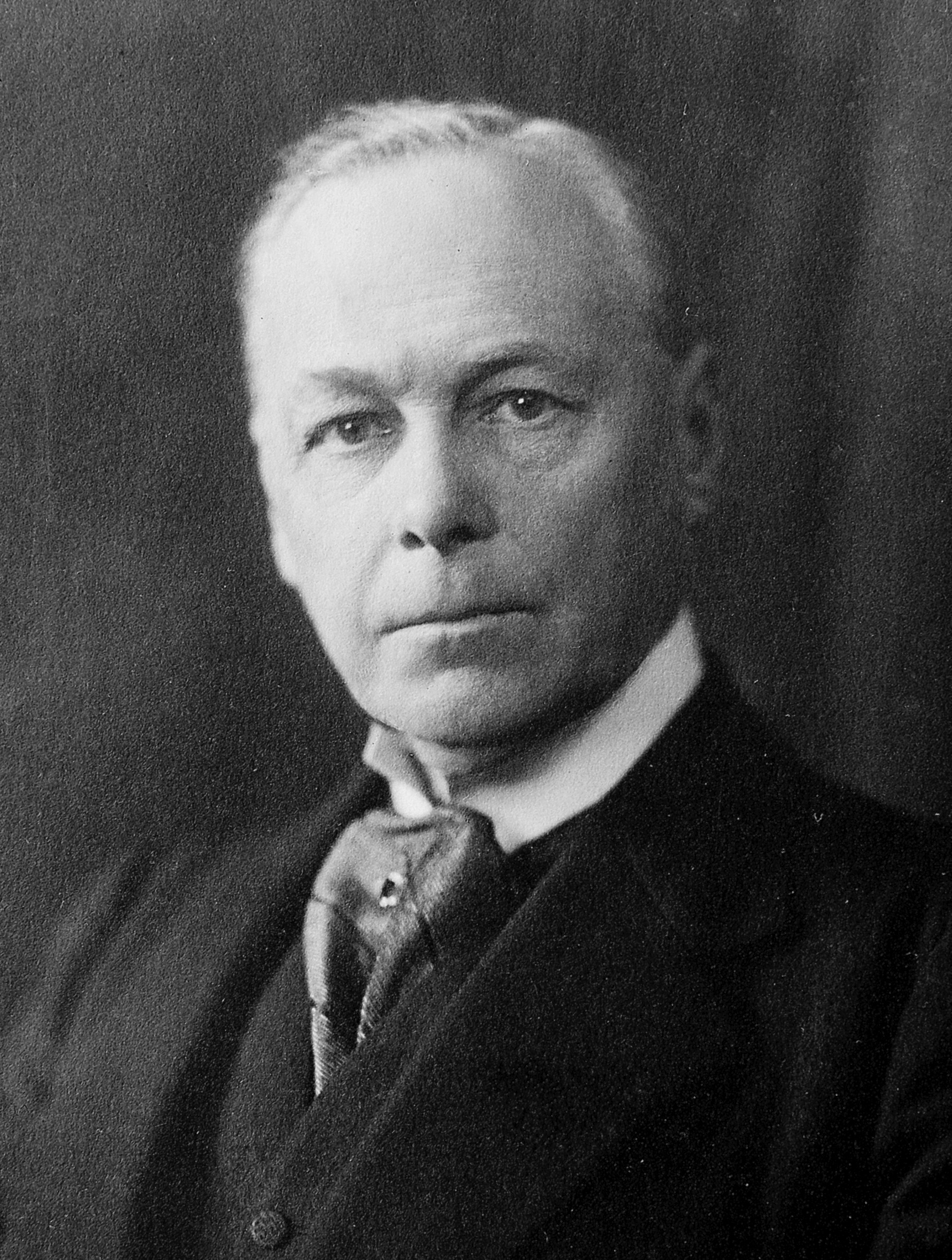
Joynson-Hicks

1908 Manchester North West by-election
Party	Candidate	Votes	%	±%
Conservative	William Joynson-Hicks	5,417	50.7	+6.9
Liberal	Winston Churchill	4,988	46.7	−9.5
Social Democratic Federation	Dan Irving	276	2.6	New
Majority		429	4.0	N/A
Turnout		10,681	89.7	+1.7
Conservative gain from Liberal		Swing	+8.2	

The following day, the Daily Telegraph ran a front page headline reading "Winston Churchill is OUT! OUT! OUT!" The Lancashire and Cheshire Women's Suffrage Society, who had supported Churchill during the by-election, were angered by the actions of the WSPU, stating that they were "actively assisting to return men to the House of Commons who are the sworn enemies of the people." and saying that the WSPU members were "Tories of the most pronounced type".

== Previous result ==
Prior to Churchill winning the seat in the 1906 General election, Manchester North West had been Conservative since its creation in 1885.

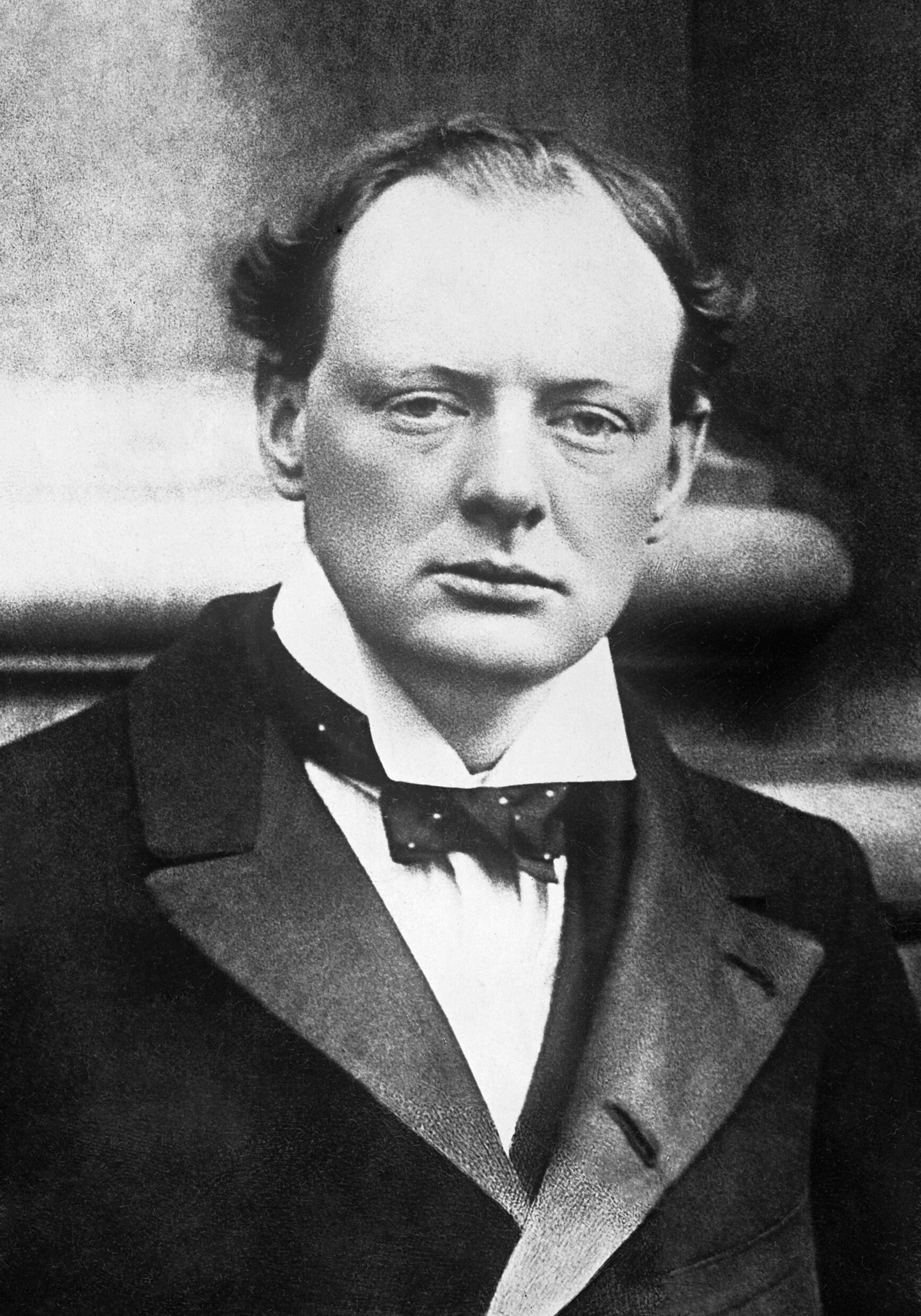
Churchill

General election January 1906
Party	Candidate	Votes	%	±%
Liberal	Winston Churchill	5,659	56.2	New
Conservative	William Joynson-Hicks	4,398	43.8	N/A
Majority		1,241	12.4	N/A
Turnout		10,057	88.0	N/A
Liberal gain from Conservative		Swing	N/A	

== Aftermath ==
Although Churchill lost his seat he was soon back, on 9 May 1908, after winning the 1908 Dundee by-election. Joynson-Hicks gained personal notoriety in the immediate aftermath of this election for an address to his Jewish hosts at a dinner given by the Maccabean Society, during which he said "he had beaten them all thoroughly and soundly and was no longer their servant." This act may have contributed to him losing his seat back to the Liberals at the next election.

General election January 1910
Party	Candidate	Votes	%	±%
Liberal	George Kemp	5,930	53.5	+6.8
Conservative	William Joynson-Hicks	5,147	46.5	−4.2
Majority		783	7.0	N/A
Turnout		11,077	92.6	+2.9
Liberal gain from Conservative		Swing	+5.5	

At the January 1910 general election, Irving stood for the SDF at Rochdale, coming third.

Churchill (Chancellor of the Exchequer) and Joynson-Hicks (Home Secretary) would later be senior Cabinet colleagues in Stanley Baldwin's Second Government (1924-29) after Churchill had rejoined the Conservative Party.
