= 1973 Manchester Exchange by-election =

UK parliamentary by-election

← 1970	27 June 1973

Constituency of Manchester Exchange
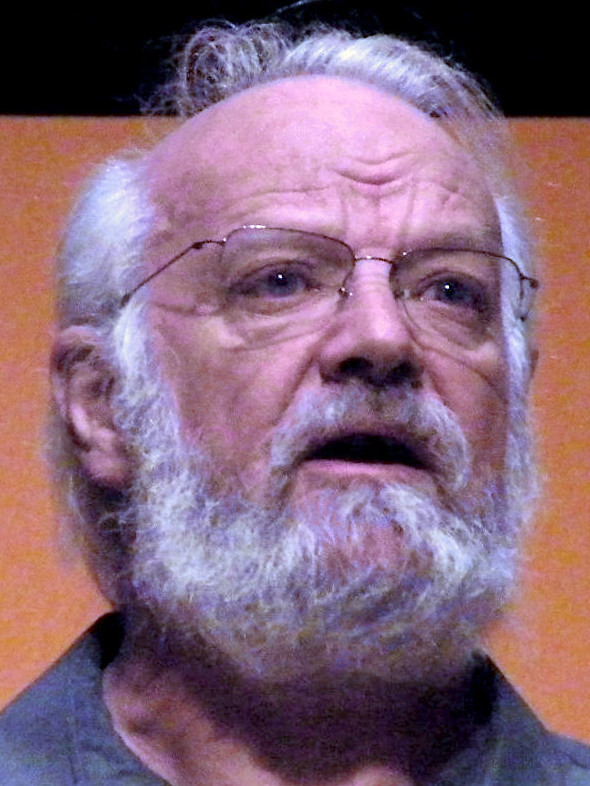
	First party	Second party	Third party
	Lab		Con
Candidate	Frank Hatton	Michael Steed	William J. Loftus
Party	Labour	Liberal	Conservative
Popular vote	5,348	3,525	683
Percentage	55.33%	36.47%	7.07%
Swing	▼13.20%	New	▼20.74%
MP before election
William Griffiths
Labour
Subsequent MP
Frank Hatton
Labour

The 1973 Manchester Exchange by-election of 27 June 1973 was held after the death of William Griffiths on 14 April of the same year. The Labour Party won the by-election in what had traditionally been a safe seat.

Due to an administrative oversight, the by-election was held on a Wednesday, rather than the Thursday which had been usual since the mid-1960s. Only one by-election since has been held on a day other than a Thursday, the 1978 Hamilton by-election.

== Result ==
Manchester Exchange by-election, 1973
Party	Candidate	Votes	%	±%
Labour	Frank Hatton	5,348	55.33	−13.20
Liberal	Michael Steed	3,525	36.47	New
Conservative	William J. Loftus	683	7.07	−20.74
Marxist-Leninist (England)	Ruth Pushkin	109	1.13	New
Majority		1,823	18.86	−21.86
Turnout		9,665		
Labour hold		Swing		
