= George Morton (Labour politician) =

British politician

George Martin Morton (born 11 February 1940) is a retired Labour Party politician in the United Kingdom.

Morton was educated at Fettes College, Edinburgh, and Glasgow University. He was an elected member of Manchester City Council and of Greater Manchester Council in the early 1970s.

Morton was elected as the Member of Parliament for Manchester Moss Side at a by-election in 1978 following the death of Labour MP Frank Hatton. He served until the constituency was abolished in boundary changes for the 1983 general election, and failed to be selected for another Manchester seat.

After Labour went into opposition following the 1979 general election, Morton served in the Labour Whips' Office and on Standing Committees on home affairs bills. He was noted for his support for civil liberties, including gay rights, and he spoke out on "miscarriage of justice" cases. He pleaded guilty to an act of gross indecency in a public toilet in Manchester in November 1980 and was fined £25. The chairman of the Constituency Labour Party (CLP) announced that he had complete confidence in him and that this was a private matter.

Prior to his election to Parliament, Morton worked as a local authority architect/planner, and he returned to this profession after leaving the House of Commons.

Parliament of the United Kingdom
Preceded by Frank Hatton	Member of Parliament for Manchester Moss Side; 1978 – 1983	Constituency abolished
