= 1940 Manchester Exchange by-election =

UK Parliamentary by-election

The 1940 Manchester Exchange by-election was held on 21 September 1940. The by-election was held due to the death of the incumbent Conservative MP, Peter Eckersley. It was won by the Conservative candidate Thomas Hewlett.
