= William Griffiths (politician) =

British politician

William Griffiths (7 April 1912 – 14 April 1973) was a British Labour Party politician and Member of Parliament in the United Kingdom.

Born in Moss Side, Manchester, Griffiths became an ophthalmic optician, and a Fellow of the British Optical Association. During World War II, he served in the Eighth Army and was still in uniform when he was elected to Parliament in 1945. He was Member of Parliament for Moss Side from 1945 until 1950 and for Manchester Exchange from 1950 until his death in 1973.

Parliament of the United Kingdom
Preceded by William Duckworth	Member of Parliament for Manchester Moss Side; 1945 – 1950	Succeeded by Florence Horsbrugh
Preceded by Harold Lever	Member of Parliament for Manchester Exchange; 1950 – 1973	Succeeded by Frank Hatton
