= Thomas Hewlett =

Member of Parliament for Manchester Exchange
- In office 21 September 1940 – 5 July 1945
- Preceded by: Peter Eckersley
- Succeeded by: Harold Lever

Personal details
- Born: Thomas Henry Hewlett; 23 November 1882
- Party: Conservative

Thomas Henry Hewlett (23 November 1882 – 25 May 1956) was a British Conservative Party politician and industrialist.

He unsuccessfully contested the 1935 general election in Manchester Clayton, but after the death in 1940 of Peter Eckersley, the Member of Parliament (MP) for Manchester Exchange, Hewlett was elected unopposed in the resulting by-election. He lost the seat in the Labour Party's landslide victory at the 1945 general election.

In addition to his political interests, Hewlett was the chairman and managing director of the Anchor Chemical Company which is based in Clayton, Manchester and is now a subsidiary of the Air Products and Chemicals.

His children included Thomas Clyde Hewlett, who became Baron Hewlett of Swettenham in the County of Chester in 1972 and the actor Donald Hewlett.

Parliament of the United Kingdom
Preceded by Peter Eckersley	Member of Parliament for Manchester Exchange; 1940–1945	Succeeded by Harold Lever
