= Manchester Moss Side =

Parliamentary constituency in the United Kingdom, 1918–1983

- Former borough constituency for the House of Commons

1918–1983
- Seats: one
- Created from: Manchester North West and Manchester East
- Replaced by: Stretford, Manchester Withington, Manchester Central and Manchester Gorton

Manchester Moss Side was a parliamentary constituency in the Moss Side area of the city of Manchester. It returned one Member of Parliament (MP) to the House of Commons of the Parliament of the United Kingdom, elected by the first past the post system.

The constituency was created for the 1918 general election and abolished for the 1983 general election.

== Boundaries ==
Manchester Moss Side in Lancashire, boundaries used 1974-83

1918–1950: The County Borough of Manchester wards of All Saints', Moss Side East, and St. Luke's.

1950–1974: The County Borough of Manchester wards of Chorlton-cum-Hardy, Moss Side East, and Moss Side West.

1974–1983: The County Borough of Manchester wards of Alexandra, Chorlton, Hulme, Lloyd Street, and Moss Side.

In 1966, 9.6% of the constituency was born in the New Commonwealth.

== Members of Parliament ==
Election	Member	Party
1918	Gerald Hurst	Conservative
1923	Thomas Ackroyd	Liberal
1924	Sir Gerald Hurst	Conservative
1935	William Duckworth	Conservative
1945	William Griffiths	Labour
1950	Florence Horsbrugh	Conservative
1959	James Watts	Conservative
1961 by-election	Frank Taylor	Conservative
Feb 1974	Frank Hatton	Labour
1978 by-election	George Morton	Labour
1983	constituency abolished	

== Election results ==
=== Elections in the 1910s ===
General election 1918: Manchester Moss Side
Party	Candidate	Votes	%	±%
Unionist	Gerald Hurst	10,621	65.0	
Liberal	Tom Stott	5,708	35.0	
Majority		4,913	30.0	
Turnout		16,329		
Unionist win (new seat)				

=== Elections in the 1920s ===
General election 1922: Manchester Moss Side
Party	Candidate	Votes	%	±%
Unionist	Gerald Hurst	11,932	51.2	−13.8
Liberal	Thomas Ackroyd	6,743	28.9	−6.1
Labour Co-op	Thomas William Mercer	4,641	19.9	New
Majority		5,189	22.3	−7.7
Turnout		23,316	70.4	
Unionist hold		Swing		

General election 1923: Manchester Moss Side
Party	Candidate	Votes	%	±%
Liberal	Thomas Ackroyd	12,210	54.9	+26.0
Unionist	Gerald Hurst	9,097	40.9	−10.3
Independent	James Charles Daniel Bustard	949	4.3	New
Majority		3,113	14.0	N/A
Turnout		22,256	66.4	−4.0
Liberal gain from Unionist		Swing	+18.1	

General election 1924: Manchester Moss Side
Party	Candidate	Votes	%	±%
Unionist	Gerald Hurst	14,035	58.3	+17.4
Liberal	Thomas Ackroyd	10,026	41.7	−13.2
Majority		4,009	16.6	N/A
Turnout		24,061	69.3	+2.9
Unionist gain from Liberal		Swing	+15.3	

General election 1929: Manchester Moss Side
Party	Candidate	Votes	%	±%
Unionist	Gerald Hurst	11,625	39.6	−18.7
Labour	A. A. Purcell	9,522	32.5	New
Liberal	Thomas Ackroyd	8,191	27.9	−13.8
Majority		2,103	7.1	−9.5
Turnout		29,338	68.3	−1.0
Unionist hold		Swing		

=== Elections in the 1930s ===
General election 1931: Manchester Moss Side
Party	Candidate	Votes	%	±%
Conservative	Gerald Hurst	23,274	74.4	+34.8
Labour	Albert Emil Davies	8,012	25.6	−6.9
Majority		15,262	48.8	+41.7
Turnout		31,286	68.2	−0.1
Conservative hold		Swing	+20.9	

General election 1935: Manchester Moss Side
Party	Candidate	Votes	%	±%
Conservative	William Duckworth	15,199	58.7	−15.7
Labour	Leslie Lever	10,694	41.3	+15.7
Majority		4,505	17.4	−31.4
Turnout		25,893	63.2	−5.0
Conservative hold		Swing	−15.7	

=== Elections in the 1940s ===
General Election 1939–40

Another General Election was required to take place before the end of 1940. The political parties had been making preparations for an election to take place from 1939 and by the end of this year, the following candidates had been selected;

- Conservative: William Duckworth
- Labour: William Griffiths

General election 1945: Manchester Moss Side
Party	Candidate	Votes	%	±%
Labour	William Griffiths	10,201	49.5	+8.2
Conservative	William Duckworth	7,423	36.0	−22.7
Liberal	Henry Donald Moore	2,525	12.3	New
Independent	A.R. Edwards	446	2.2	New
Majority		2,778	13.5	N/A
Turnout		20,595	59.4	−3.8
Labour gain from Conservative		Swing	+15.5	

=== Elections in the 1950s ===
The original Conservative candidate in 1950 was Edward Fleming, MP for Manchester Withington, whose Chorlton-cum-Hardy ward had become part of Moss Side due to boundary changes. He died six days before polling day, causing a delayed poll.

General election 1950: Manchester Moss Side
Party	Candidate	Votes	%	±%
Conservative	Florence Horsbrugh	25,347	56.7	+20.7
Labour	Roland Casasola	16,769	37.5	−12.0
Liberal	Eric Percy Atkin	2,607	5.8	−6.5
Majority		8,578	19.2	+5.7
Turnout		44,723	78.7	+19.3
Conservative hold		Swing	+16.4	

General election 1951: Manchester Moss Side
Party	Candidate	Votes	%	±%
Conservative	Florence Horsbrugh	27,697	62.2	+5.5
Labour	Frank Allaun	16,819	37.8	+0.3
Majority		10,878	24.4	+5.2
Turnout		44,516	77.6	−1.1
Conservative hold		Swing	+2.6	

General election 1955: Manchester Moss Side
Party	Candidate	Votes	%	±%
Conservative	Florence Horsbrugh	23,631	64.3	+2.1
Labour	Kenneth Marks	13,103	35.7	−2.1
Majority		10,528	28.7	+4.3
Turnout		36,734	69.1	−8.5
Conservative hold		Swing	+2.1	

General election 1959: Manchester Moss Side
Party	Candidate	Votes	%	±%
Conservative	James Watts	22,090	62.3	−2.0
Labour	Norman Morris	13,371	37.7	+2.0
Majority		8,719	24.6	+5.0
Turnout		35,461	69.2	+0.1
Conservative hold		Swing	−2.0	

=== Elections in the 1960s ===
1961 Manchester Moss Side by-election
Party	Candidate	Votes	%	±%
Conservative	Frank Taylor	9,533	41.1	−21.2
Liberal	Ruslyn Hargreaves	6,447	27.8	New
Labour	Gordon Oakes	5,980	25.8	−11.9
Union Movement	Walter Hesketh	1,212	5.2	New
Majority		3,086	13.3	−11.3
Turnout		23,172		
Conservative hold		Swing		

General election 1964: Manchester Moss Side
Party	Candidate	Votes	%	±%
Conservative	Frank Taylor	14,875	45.3	−17.0
Labour	Peter W. Michelson	10,647	32.4	−5.3
Liberal	Ruslyn Hargreaves	7,297	22.2	N/A
Majority		4,228	12.9	−11.7
Turnout		32,819	65.5	−4.7
Conservative hold		Swing		

General election 1966: Manchester Moss Side
Party	Candidate	Votes	%	±%
Conservative	Frank Taylor	13,436	45.4	+0.1
Labour	Rex Church	12,353	41.8	+9.4
Liberal	David F. Prusmann	3,801	12.9	−9.3
Majority		1,083	3.6	−9.7
Turnout		29,590	65.4	−0.1
Conservative hold		Swing		

=== Elections in the 1970s ===
General election 1970: Manchester Moss Side
Party	Candidate	Votes	%	±%
Conservative	Frank Taylor	15,546	52.9	+7.5
Labour	Frank Hatton	13,833	47.1	+5.3
Majority		1,713	5.8	+2.2
Turnout		29,379	64.4	−1.0
Conservative hold		Swing		

Note: This constituency underwent boundary changes after the 1970 election, so was notionally a Labour seat.

General election February 1974: Manchester Moss Side
Party	Candidate	Votes	%	±%
Labour	Frank Hatton	14,715	41.8	−8.5
Conservative	Frank Taylor	12,323	35.0	−14.7
Liberal	William Wallace	7,979	22.7	New
Marxist-Leninist (England)	Ruth Pushkin	206	0.6	New
Majority		2,392	6.8	+1.0
Turnout		35,223	69.1	+4.7
Labour hold		Swing	+11.6	

General election October 1974: Manchester Moss Side
Party	Candidate	Votes	%	±%
Labour	Frank Hatton	15,212	47.1	+5.3
Conservative	John Lee	11,101	34.3	−0.7
Liberal	William Wallace	5,686	17.6	−5.1
Irish Civil Rights	Neil Boyle	238	0.7	New
More Prosperous Britain	Harold Smith	96	0.3	New
Majority		4,111	12.8	+6.0
Turnout		32,333	62.9	−6.2
Labour hold		Swing	+2.9	

1978 Manchester Moss Side by-election
Party	Candidate	Votes	%	±%
Labour	George Morton	12,556	46.38	−0.7
Conservative	Thomas E. Murphy	10,998	40.6	+6.3
Liberal	Peter Thomson	2,502	9.2	−8.4
National Front	Herbert Andrew	623	2.3	New
Workers Revolutionary	Vanessa Redgrave	394	1.5	New
Majority		1,558	5.8	−6.9
Turnout		27,073		
Labour hold		Swing		

General election 1979: Manchester Moss Side
Party	Candidate	Votes	%	±%
Labour	George Morton	17,765	51.9	+4.8
Conservative	Thomas E. Murphy	13,234	38.7	+4.4
Liberal	John Commons	2,981	8.7	−8.9
Workers Revolutionary	Vanessa Redgrave	225	0.7	New
Majority		4,531	13.2	+7.4
Turnout		34,205	71.5	+8.6
Labour hold		Swing		
