= 1978 Manchester Moss Side by-election =

UK parliamentary by-election

The 1978 Manchester Moss Side by-election of 13 July 1978 was held following the death of Labour Member of Parliament (MP) Frank Hatton. Labour held on to the seat in the by-election.

== Result ==
Manchester Moss Side by-election, 1978
Party	Candidate	Votes	%	±%
Labour	George Morton	12,556	46.38	−0.67
Conservative	Thomas Murphy	10,998	40.62	+6.29
Liberal	Peter Thomson	2,502	9.24	−8.35
National Front	Herbert Andrew	623	2.30	New
Workers Revolutionary	Vanessa Redgrave	394	1.46	New
Majority		1,558	5.8	−6.9
Turnout		27.073		
Labour hold		Swing		
