= Harold Lever, Baron Lever of Manchester =

British barrister and politician

The Right Honourable The Lord Lever of Manchester PC

Chancellor of the Duchy of Lancaster
- In office 5 March 1974 – 4 May 1979
- Prime Minister: Harold Wilson; James Callaghan
- Preceded by: John Davies
- Succeeded by: Norman St John-Stevas

Member of Parliament for Manchester Central
- In office 28 February 1974 – 3 July 1979
- Preceded by: Constituency Created
- Succeeded by: Bob Litherland

Member of Parliament for Manchester Cheetham
- In office 23 February 1950 – 8 February 1974
- Preceded by: Constituency Created
- Succeeded by: Constituency Abolished

Member of Parliament for Manchester Exchange
- In office 5 July 1945 – 3 February 1950
- Preceded by: Thomas Hewlett
- Succeeded by: William Griffiths

Personal details
- Born: 15 January 1914 Manchester, England
- Died: 6 August 1995 (aged 81) London, England
- Party: Labour
- Education: University of Manchester

Norman Harold Lever, Baron Lever of Manchester, PC (15 January 1914 – 6 August 1995) was a British barrister and Labour Party politician.

== Early life ==
He was born in Manchester, the son of a Jewish textile merchant from Lithuania, and was educated at Manchester Grammar School and Manchester University. He was called to the Bar of the Middle Temple in 1935. During World War II he served in the Royal Air Force. His brother was Leslie Lever, Baron Lever.

== Career ==
Lever was elected Member of Parliament for Manchester Exchange at the 1945 general election, then Manchester, Cheetham from 1950 to 1974. His brother, Leslie Lever, was elected MP for the neighbouring Manchester Ardwick seat. He promoted the Private Member's Bill that became the Defamation Act 1952.

He was Joint Parliamentary Under-Secretary of State for Economic Affairs in 1967; Financial Secretary to the Treasury, September 1967–69; Paymaster General, 1969–70, a Member of the Shadow Cabinet from 1970 to 1974 and Chairman of the Public Accounts Committee, 1970–73. His seat changed again, becoming Manchester Central from 1974 to 1979. On Labour's return to power after the February 1974 general election, he was Chancellor of the Duchy of Lancaster from 1974 to 1979.

Lever held a number of business appointments in the banking and journalism sectors. He was Governor of the London School of Economics from 1971, and of the English Speaking Union 1973–86. He was a Trustee of the Royal Opera House from 1974 to 1982, and a Member of the Court of Manchester University from 1975 to 1987. He was an Honorary Fellow, and Chairman of the Trustees of the Royal Academy from 1981 to 1987. He held Honorary doctorates in Law, Science, Literature and Technology and was awarded the Grand Cross, Order of Merit, Germany, 1979.

He was appointed a Privy Counsellor in 1969 and created a life peer as Baron Lever of Manchester, of Cheetham in the City of Manchester on 3 July 1979. As a Peer and elder statesman he successfully arbitrated the 1980 Steel Strike, one of the UK's longest industrial disputes. In 1983 he served on the Franks Committee, a committee of inquiry by six Privy Counsellors into the Falklands War. In 1984 he was Chairman of the Commonwealth Prime Ministers' commission into the Developing World Debt Crisis. The following year, 1985 he co-wrote "Debt and Danger" which advocated excusing the Developing World a debt burden which was crippling their fragile economies.

== Personal life ==
His first marriage was in 1939, to a medical student, Ethel Sebrinski (née Samuel), which ended in "a friendly divorce".

In 1945, he married Betty "Billie" Featherman (née Wolfe), and they had one daughter, but Betty died of leukemia shortly after the birth.

His third wife was Mrs Diane Zilkha (née Bashi), the ex-wife of Selim Zilkha, and they married at the Westminster Synagogue on 15 March 1962. They had three daughters. They were married for over 30 years until his death on 6 August 1995, and lived in a 22-roomed apartment in Eaton Square, which Diane "converted ... into a palace".

He was a strong bridge player, who represented both the House of Commons and the House of Lords in their annual match. The side he played for usually won.

== Death and legacy ==
He died in August 1995, aged 81.

In Whitehall, he is perhaps best remembered for key interventions as a minister during the UK's 1976 IMF/sterling crisis, especially when he successfully proposed in June that the Government demand a large bridging credit from international partners; this came to be regarded by HM Treasury's chief as making eventual recourse to the IMF inevitable.

Parliament of the United Kingdom
Preceded by Thomas Hewlett	Member of Parliament for Manchester Exchange; 1945–1950	Succeeded by William Griffiths
New constituency	Member of Parliament for Manchester Cheetham; 1950–1974	Constituency abolished
New constituency	Member of Parliament for Manchester Central; 1974–1979	Succeeded by Bob Litherland
Political offices
Preceded by Niall MacDermot	Financial Secretary to the Treasury; 1967–1969	Succeeded by Dick Taverne
Preceded by John Davies	Chancellor of the Duchy of Lancaster; 1974–1979	Succeeded by Norman St John-Stevas
