= Robert Noton Barclay =

British politician (1872-1957)

- Barclay as Lord Mayor of Manchester in 1940

Member of Parliament for Manchester Exchange
- In office 6 December 1923 – 9 October 1924
- Preceded by: Edwin Stockton
- Succeeded by: Edward Fielden

Personal details
- Born: 11 May 1872
- Died: 24 November 1957 (aged 85)
- Party: Liberal Party
- Spouse: Helena M. Bythell (m. 1898)
- Children: 2 sons and 3 daughters

Sir Robert Noton Barclay (11 May 1872 – 24 November 1957) was an English export shipping merchant, banker and a Liberal Party politician who served as Lord Mayor of Manchester, England

== Family and education ==
Barclay was the son of Robert Barclay, a South America shipping merchant, with strong connections to the Lancashire cotton trade. He attended Uppingham School and the Victoria University of Manchester. In 1898, he married Helena Margaret Bythell and they had two sons, John and Robbie and three daughters, Margaret, Elizabeth and Rosalind. Barclay's sister, Mary Jane (1870–1939), married John Hope Simpson who was Liberal MP for Taunton from 1922 to 1924.

== Career ==
Barclay was an export shipping merchant. He succeeded his father in the family firm, Robert Barclay & Co in Manchester but he also had other extensive business interests. He was director of the District Bank from 1913, being its Deputy Chairman from 1932 and chairman from 1936 to 1946. He was also a director of the National Boiler Co. and of the Manchester Ship Canal Company.

== Public life ==
Barclay served as a Justice of the Peace for Manchester. He played a prominent role in the commercial life of Manchester, being President of the Manchester Chamber of Commerce from 1914 to 1916 and in 1931 he was a member of a British trade delegation to Argentina led by Sir Robert Burton-Chadwick. He served as High Sheriff of Cheshire for 1937–1938. Barclay was active in several branches of social and philanthropic work in Manchester, notably as Chairman of the Manchester YMCA and as a member of the court and council of Manchester University. He was knighted in 1936 for public and philanthropic services in Manchester.

== Donations of property ==
In 1929 Barclay purchased land known as the Ings and Stable Hills on the shore of Derwent Water in the Lake District and presented them to the National Trust. He later acquired Wray Castle on Windermere near Ambleside and made a gift of the castle and 64 acres (260,000 m^{2}) of the surrounding land to the National Trust.

In 1943 he presented his then home at Mobberley Hall, Cheshire to the Manchester Education Committee for use as a residential school.

== Politics ==
=== Manchester politics ===
Barclay was first elected a member of Manchester City Council in 1917 and amongst the committees he served on, he was a member of the Finance Committee. He was later an Alderman of the City and served as Lord Mayor of Manchester for the year 1929–1930. In 1938 he was appointed as Chairman of the city's Air Raid Precautions special committee and the following year he was elected to chair the Emergency committee, an important position while the country was preparing for war. He held the post into the Second World War.

He was High Sheriff of Cheshire for 1937.

=== Parliament ===
Barclay first stood for Parliament at the 1923 general election. In a straight fight in the Manchester Exchange constituency he defeated the sitting Conservative MP, Sir Edwin Stockton by a majority of 1,799 votes.

In 1924 he faced a new Tory opponent Edward Fielden. By 1924 the Conservatives had revived nationally and Fielden regained the seat with a majority of 2,507. Barclay tried to win back Manchester Exchange at the 1929 general election but in a three-cornered contest he again came in second behind the Conservative, with Labour third. He did not stand for election to the House of Commons again.

== Death ==
Barclay died in hospital following an accident on 24 November 1957 aged 85 years. Lady Barclay survived until 27 October 1960 when she died at the family home, Far Hills, Alderley Edge, Cheshire.

Parliament of the United Kingdom
Preceded by Edwin Stockton	Member of Parliament for Manchester Exchange; 1923–1924	Succeeded by Edward Fielden
