= Manchester Exchange (constituency) =

Parliamentary constituency in the United Kingdom, 1918–1974

- Former borough constituency for the House of Commons

1918–February 1974
- Seats: one
- Created from: Manchester North West
- Replaced by: Manchester Central

Manchester Exchange was a parliamentary constituency in the city of Manchester. It returned one Member of Parliament (MP) to the House of Commons of the Parliament of the United Kingdom, elected by the first past the post system.

The constituency was created for the 1918 general election and abolished for the February 1974 general election.

== Boundaries ==
1918–1950: The County Borough of Manchester wards of Cheetham, Collegiate Church, Exchange, Oxford, St. Ann's, St. Clement's, and St. John's, and part of St. Michael's ward.

1950–1955: The County Borough of Manchester wards of All Saints', Exchange, Medlock Street, Oxford, St Ann's, St. Clement's, St. George's, St. John's, and St. Luke's.

1955–1974: The County Borough of Manchester wards of All Saints', Beswick, New Cross, St. George's, and St. Peter's.

== Members of Parliament ==
Election	Member	Party
1918	Sir John Randles	Coalition Conservative
1922	Sir Edwin Stockton	Conservative
1923	Robert Noton Barclay	Liberal
1924	Edward Fielden	Conservative
1935	Peter Eckersley	Conservative
1940 by-election	Thomas Hewlett	Conservative
1945	Harold Lever	Labour
1950	William Griffiths	Labour
1973 by-election	Frank Hatton	Labour
Feb 1974	constituency abolished	

== Election results ==
=== Elections in the 1910s ===
General election 1918: Manchester Exchange
Party		Candidate	Votes	%	±%
C	Unionist	John Randles	12,290	69.8	
	Liberal	Arthur Haworth	5,326	30.2	
Majority			6,984	39.6	
Turnout			17,616	51.0	
	Unionist win (new seat)				
C indicates candidate endorsed by the coalition government.

=== Elections in the 1920s ===
Barton

General election 1922: Manchester Exchange
Party	Candidate	Votes	%	±%
Unionist	Edwin Stockton	13,919	57.8	−12.0
Liberal	William Barton	10,148	42.2	+12.0
Majority		3,771	15.6	−24.0
Turnout		24,067	61.2	+10.2
Unionist hold		Swing	−12.0	

General election 1923: Manchester Exchange
Party	Candidate	Votes	%	±%
Liberal	Robert Barclay	12,248	54.0	+11.8
Unionist	Edwin Stockton	10,449	46.0	−11.8
Majority		1,799	8.0	N/A
Turnout		22,697	59.4	−1.8
Liberal gain from Unionist		Swing	+11.8	

General election 1924: Manchester Exchange
Party	Candidate	Votes	%	±%
Unionist	Edward Fielden	13,200	55.2	+9.2
Liberal	Robert Barclay	10,693	44.8	−9.2
Majority		2,507	10.4	N/A
Turnout		23,893	59.0	−0.4
Unionist gain from Liberal		Swing		

General election 1929: Manchester Exchange
Party	Candidate	Votes	%	±%
Unionist	Edward Fielden	13,691	39.9	−15.3
Liberal	Robert Barclay	11,112	32.4	−12.4
Labour	Arthur Moss	9,500	27.7	New
Majority		2,579	7.5	−2.9
Turnout		34,303	70.2	+11.2
Unionist hold		Swing	−1.5	

=== Election in the 1930s ===
General election 1931: Manchester Exchange
Party	Candidate	Votes	%	±%
Conservative	Edward Fielden	24,261	73.5	+33.6
Labour	E.A. Gower	8,727	26.5	−0.8
Majority		15,534	47.0	+39.5
Turnout		29,497	66.2	−4.0
Conservative hold		Swing		

Paish

General election 1935: Manchester Exchange
Party	Candidate	Votes	%	±%
Conservative	Peter Eckersley	15,956	54.1	−19.4
Labour	Eric L. Mendel	8,313	28.2	+1.7
Liberal	George Paish	5,228	17.7	New
Majority		7,643	25.9	−21.1
Turnout		29,497	63.3	−2.9
Conservative hold		Swing		

=== Election in the 1940s ===
General Election 1939–40:

Another General Election was required to take place before the end of 1940. The political parties had been making preparations for an election to take place from 1939 and by the end of this year, the following candidates had been selected;

- Conservative: Peter Eckersley
- Liberal: George Paish
- Labour: R McKeon

1940 Manchester Exchange by-election
Party	Candidate	Votes	%	±%
Conservative	Thomas Hewlett	Unopposed	N/A	N/A
Conservative hold				

General election 1945: Manchester Exchange
Party	Candidate	Votes	%	±%
Labour	Harold Lever	11,067	55.0	+26.8
Conservative	Thomas Hewlett	7,050	35.0	−18.9
Liberal	Heric Kenyon	2,018	10.0	−7.7
Majority		4,017	20.0	N/A
Turnout		20,135	70.3	+7.0
Labour gain from Conservative		Swing		

=== Elections in the 1950s ===
General election 1950: Manchester Exchange
Party	Candidate	Votes	%	±%
Labour	William Griffiths	18,335	54.1	−0.9
Conservative	R.S. Harper	13,716	40.5	+5.5
Liberal	John Cooper	1,812	5.4	−4.6
Majority		4,619	13.6	−6.4
Turnout		33,863	74.8	−8.5
Labour hold		Swing	+4.5	

General election 1951: Manchester Exchange
Party	Candidate	Votes	%	±%
Labour	William Griffiths	18,475	55.4	+1.3
Conservative	Idris Owen	14,881	44.6	+4.1
Majority		3,594	10.8	−2.8
Turnout		33,356	72.4	−2.4
Labour hold		Swing	+4.5	

General election 1955: Manchester Exchange
Party	Candidate	Votes	%	±%
Labour	William Griffiths	20,203	61.0	+5.6
Conservative	Basil de Ferranti	12,922	39.0	−5.6
Majority		7,281	22.0	+11.2
Turnout		33,125	63.2	−8.5
Labour hold		Swing	+5.6	

General election 1959: Manchester Exchange
Party	Candidate	Votes	%	±%
Labour	William Griffiths	19,328	64.6	+3.6
Conservative	Leonard Smith	10,604	35.4	−3.6
Majority		8,724	29.2	+7.2
Turnout		29,932	63.6	+0.4
Labour hold		Swing	+3.6	

=== Elections in the 1960s ===
General election 1964: Manchester Exchange
Party	Candidate	Votes	%	±%
Labour	William Griffiths	13,952	69.1	+4.5
Conservative	Beata Brookes	6,242	30.9	−4.5
Majority		7,710	38.2	+9.0
Turnout		20,194	55.8	−7.8
Labour hold		Swing	+4.5	

General election 1966: Manchester Exchange
Party	Candidate	Votes	%	±%
Labour	William Griffiths	10,425	73.5	+4.4
Conservative	John Stuart-Mills	3,761	26.5	−4.4
Majority		6,664	47.0	+8.8
Turnout		14,186	53.7	−2.1
Labour hold		Swing	+4.4	

=== Elections in the 1970s ===
General election 1970: Manchester Exchange
Party	Candidate	Votes	%	±%
Labour	William Griffiths	8,234	68.5	−5.0
Conservative	William J. Loftus	3,341	27.8	+1.3
Independent	G.E. Spencer	440	3.7	New
Majority		4,893	40.7	−6.3
Turnout		12,015	57.0	+4.3
Labour hold		Swing	−3.2	

1973 Manchester Exchange by-election
Party	Candidate	Votes	%	±%
Labour	Frank Hatton	5,348	55.33	−13.20
Liberal	Michael Steed	3,525	36.47	New
Conservative	William J. Loftus	683	7.07	−20.74
Marxist-Leninist (England)	Ruth Pushkin	109	1.13	New
Majority		1,823	18.86	−21.86
Turnout		9,665		
Labour hold		Swing		
