= British Post Office scandal =

Ongoing UK legal and political scandal

- Date: 1999–present
- Location: United Kingdom
- Also known as: Horizon IT scandal
- Cause: Software defects in Fujitsu's Horizon IT system and failure to disclose faults during prosecutions
- Participants: Sir Alan Bates; Paula Vennells; Adam Crozier
- Outcome: High Court ruling in Bates v Post Office Ltd (2019); Mass exoneration via Post Office (Horizon System) Offences Act 2024
- Deaths: 13 suicides
- Inquiries: Post Office Horizon IT Inquiry
- Convicted: Over 900 wrongful convictions

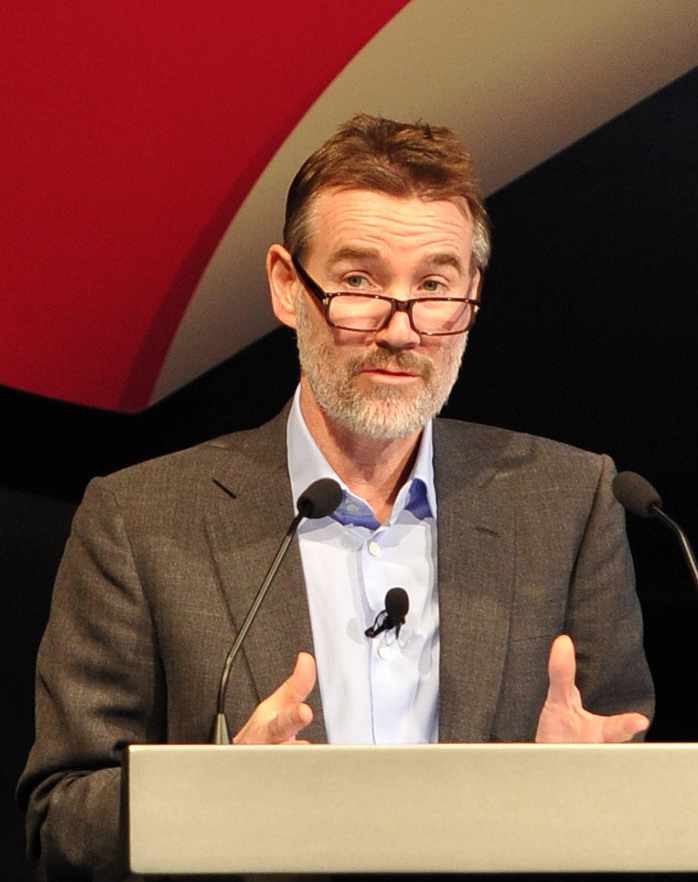
Adam Crozier was the CEO of Royal Mail between 2003 and 2010, when it owned the Post Office

The British Post Office scandal, also called the Horizon IT scandal, involved the Post Office's pursuit of thousands of innocent subpostmasters for apparent financial shortfalls caused by faults in Horizon, an accounting software system developed by Fujitsu. Between 1999 and 2015, more than 900 subpostmasters were wrongfully convicted of theft, fraud and false accounting based on faulty Horizon data, with about 700 of these prosecutions carried out by the Post Office. Other subpostmasters were prosecuted but not convicted, forced to cover illusory shortfalls caused by Horizon with their own money, or had their contracts terminated. The court cases, criminal convictions, imprisonments, loss of livelihoods and homes, debts, and bankruptcies led to stress, illness and family breakdowns, and were linked to at least thirteen suicides. In 2024, Prime Minister Rishi Sunak described the scandal as one of the greatest miscarriages of justice in British history.

Although many subpostmasters had reported problems with the new software, and Fujitsu was aware that Horizon contained software bugs as early as 1999, the Post Office insisted that Horizon was robust and failed to disclose knowledge of the faults in the system during criminal and civil cases. In 2009, Computer Weekly broke the story about problems with Horizon, and the former subpostmaster Alan Bates launched the Justice for Subpostmasters Alliance (JFSA). In 2012, following pressure from campaigners and Members of Parliament, the Post Office appointed forensic accountants from the firm Second Sight to conduct an investigation into Horizon. With Second Sight and the JFSA, the Post Office set up a mediation scheme for subpostmasters but terminated it after 18 months.

In 2017, 555 subpostmasters led by Bates brought a group action against the Post Office in the High Court. In 2019, the judge ruled that the subpostmasters' contracts were unfair, and that Horizon "contained bugs, errors and defects". The case was settled for £58 million, leaving the claimants with £12 million after legal costs. The judge's rulings led to subpostmasters challenging their convictions in the courts and the government setting up an independent inquiry in 2020. The inquiry was converted into a statutory public inquiry the following year and concluded in December 2024. The Metropolitan Police opened an investigation into personnel from the Post Office and Fujitsu.

Courts began to quash the subpostmasters' convictions in December 2020; by February 2024, 100 had been overturned. Those wrongfully convicted became eligible for compensation, as did more than 2,750 subpostmasters who had been affected but not convicted. The final cost of compensation is expected to exceed £1 billion. In January 2024, ITV broadcast a television drama, Mr Bates vs The Post Office, which made the scandal a major news story and political issue. In May 2024, the UK Parliament passed a law overturning the convictions of subpostmasters in England, Wales and Northern Ireland, while Scotland passed a similar law.

== Prosecutions ==
Between 1999 and 2015, the Post Office and the statutory authorities of the UK, including the CPS, the PPSNI, and the COPFS, brought forward hundreds of criminal prosecutions of subpostmasters (Note: A small number of those prosecuted were not subpostmasters but were their assistants, or were employees of the Post Office in Crown Offices.) when the Horizon accounting system reported that money was missing from their post offices. In all, between 1999 and 2015, more than 900 subpostmasters were prosecuted and 236 went to prison. The Post Office itself prosecuted 700 people.

Once the Post Office secured a criminal conviction, it attempted to secure a Proceeds of Crime Act order against convicted subpostmasters, allowing it to seize their assets. In addition to those convicted, there were subpostmasters who were prosecuted but not convicted, and many more who, without being prosecuted, had their contracts terminated and lost money as they were forced to pay the Post Office for Horizon shortfalls. The actions of the Post Office caused the loss of jobs, bankruptcy, family breakdown, criminal convictions and prison sentences, and were linked to at least thirteen suicides.

By February 2024, more than 4,000 subpostmasters were identified as eligible for compensation. In Scotland, 73 convicted subpostmasters were identified in 2020. By March 2024, 19 of those 73 had applied for their convictions to be reviewed. The BBC reported it was possible that hundreds more people in Scotland were accused of stealing money but not convicted. In Northern Ireland, 53 convicted subpostmasters have been identified.

=== Post Office as private prosecutor ===
At the time of the prosecutions, the Post Office had the same standing in law as any other private prosecutor in the British legal system. It acted as a private prosecutor in England and Wales. In Scotland, it reported allegations of crime to a procurator fiscal, and in Northern Ireland to the Public Prosecution Service.

Historically, Royal Mail and the Post Office were part of the same entity and were a public authority. They split into separate organisations in 2012. The Post Office's unique position, with a history as a prosecutor going back to 1683, gave the Criminal Cases Review Commission (CCRC) concerns about its neutrality. In June 2020, the chair of the CCRC wrote to the Justice Select Committee asking if the committee would undertake a formal review of the circumstances, and what safeguards were in place, "when an organisation is allowed to act as a prosecutor when it is also the victim and the investigator of an alleged offence". The committee's report into private prosecutions and their safeguards, published in October 2020, noted that barrister Paul Marshall, who represented several subpostmasters, had argued that the private nature of the prosecutions was not a significant cause of the Horizon scandal. He explained, instead, that it would be unlikely that the prosecutions could be considered distinct from those of the CPS due to the history of the organisation. The report stated:

The Post Office is not a typical private prosecutor ... The Private Prosecutors' Association question whether the Post Office was conducting private prosecutions at all and was in fact a 'publicly-owned entity and a public prosecutor' during the relevant period... One of the CCRC's principal concerns is whether any organisation with the Post Office's combined status, as victim, investigator and prosecutor, would be able to take decisions on investigations and disclosure 'appropriately free from conflict of interest and conscious or unconscious bias'.

== Post Office civil cases against subpostmasters ==
In 2003, the Post Office pursued a civil claim against Julie Wolstenholme, subpostmaster at Cleveleys post office in Lancashire. The Post Office dropped its claim and settled Wolstenholme's counterclaim out of court after a jointly appointed expert, Jason Coyne, reported that discrepancies could have been caused by faults in Horizon.

In spite of the outcome in the Wolstenholme case, the Post Office continued to pursue subpostmasters in the civil courts. Lee Castleton, a subpostmaster in Bridlington, Yorkshire, was pursued for £25,859 after he refused to pay a shortfall that had been caused by Horizon. The case was heard before judge Richard Havery in December 2006 and January 2007. Castleton represented himself and counterclaimed damages in the sum of £11,250 on the ground that the Post Office wrongfully determined (that is, terminated) his contract as a subpostmaster following his suspension. The judge found for the Post Office on both the claim and the counterclaim. Unable to afford the losses and the £321,000 in legal costs, Castleton declared himself bankrupt. In September 2023, solicitor Stephen Dilley, who had represented the Post Office in the case, told the Post Office Horizon IT Inquiry that the Post Office had known Castleton would not be able to pay if he lost, but wanted to send "a message that they were willing to defend the Fujitsu Horizon". Dilley defended the decision not to disclose details of the 12,000–15,000 calls being made every month by other sub-postmasters reporting technical problems with Horizon, saying the request for disclosure by Castleton was 'onerous'.

Richard Morgan, who had designed the strategy of the Post Office case against Castleton and represented the Post Office at trial, denied that he had been given instruction to establish a legal point. He said "he would have told Post Office he would not do it if those instructions had been given." This strategy was repeatedly referred to as a "nice legal point" by counsel to the Horizon Inquiry, Jason Beer. Richard Moorhead maintains "The same strategy formed a central part of the Post Office's thinking in subsequent cases and provided a legal rationale for insulating Horizon from legal challenges without proper evidence of its robustness." The Castleton case was analysed and assessed by the University of Exeter School of Law in 2024.

== Post Office management structure ==
The Post Office business, along with the Royal Mail delivery service, were formerly part of the General Post Office, tracing its origins back to 1516. It became a statutory corporation after the passage of the Post Office Act 1969. A gradual business restructuring process started in 1969 and was completed in 2012, after the Postal Services Act 2011 placed Royal Mail under separate ownership. Post Office Limited became and has remained a single share government-owned entity with government represented at board level.

Oversight of Post Office Limited was assigned to what later became the Department for Business, Energy and Industrial Strategy. As well as a succession of junior post office ministers, ultimate control was held by civil servants including Brian Bender, Simon Fraser, Martin Donnelly and Alex Chisholm. From 2003, Royal Mail (and thus the post office business) came under the management of the Shareholder Executive, which in 2016 was merged into UK Government Investments.

Key personnel who presided over the Post Office while these events unfolded include Adam Crozier, who headed Royal Mail when it owned the Post Office between 2003 and 2010; and Paula Vennells, who became chief executive officer of Post Office Limited from 2012 to 2019. Commenting in January 2024 on the governance arrangements and the scandal, the Institute for Government said

Complex governance arrangements can make it hard to pin accountability on individuals. These complexities mean that if any accountable person wanted to believe that someone else should have gripped the problem instead of them, plenty of such candidates were available. It is not yet clear which of the successive chairs, chief executives, board members, shareholder directors, regulators, departmental sponsors or ministers should carry the can, if any – but, collectively, there was a lack of clear accountability from which the government must learn. This is not just a question of who should have spotted and acknowledged the problem, but who should have driven its resolution over time.

The peer James Arbuthnot, who supported the subpostmasters, said in November 2019:

My own suggestion is that the government should clear out the entirety of the board and senior management of the Post Office and start again, perhaps with the assistance of consultancy services from Second Sight, who know where the bodies are buried.

=== Subpostmasters' contracts ===
Subpostmasters (SPMRs or SPMs) are self-employed and run branch post offices under contract to the Post Office. There were approximately 11,000 local branches. In Bates & Others v Post Office Ltd, the subpostmasters argued that the Post Office owed a duty of good faith because a relational contract existed. The Post Office relied entirely on the actual wording in the contracts, which stated:

The Operator shall be fully liable for any loss of or damage to, any Post Office Cash and Stock (however this occurs and whether it occurs as a result of any negligence by the Operator, its Personnel or otherwise, or as a result of any breach of the Agreement by the Operator) ... Any deficiencies in stocks of Products and/or any resulting shortfall in the money payable to Post Office Ltd must be made good by the Operator without delay so that, in the case of any shortfall, Post Office Ltd is paid the full amount.

Mr Justice Fraser found that the "contractual relationship between the Post Office and the SPMs was a relational contract. This imposes an implied duty of good faith on both parties." He added that "the parties must refrain from conduct which in the relevant context would be regarded as commercially unacceptable by reasonable and honest people." His ruling states that contractual terms which required co-operation in investigating shortfalls were implied into the contracts and that some onerous and unusual terms in an earlier version of the subpostmaster contract would only have been incorporated if adequate notice of their inclusion had been given.

=== Management culture ===
In July 2023, Parliament debated the Post Office's management culture. The then government representative, Tom Cooper, a senior civil servant, had been heavily criticised and had resigned following a scandal concerning Post Office bonuses and the slow disclosure of documents to the Horizon Inquiry. "That is not a great look for the Government and it raises real questions about the governance of Post Office Ltd." said Marion Fellows MP. Writing in The Guardian in July 2023, Marina Hyde said: "It remains something of a downer that the most widespread injustice in British legal history doesn't get the full-spectrum fever coverage that is lavished on more frivolous news – but then, the forces formerly known as The Man have always wanted this one covered up ... Wyn Williams's long-awaited and tirelessly fought-for inquiry is hearing evidence, except on the days it can't, because the Post Office is continually failing to hand over evidence."

On 27 January 2024, Post Office chairman Henry Staunton was dismissed by Business Secretary Kemi Badenoch, who said that his departure was about more than just the Horizon scandal, but concerned the governance of the Post Office more generally. In February 2024 it was reported that the government would meet representatives of post office operators to discuss the possibility of handing them ownership of the Post Office.

=== Tax avoidance by Post Office management ===
BBC business editor Simon Jack reported in January 2024 that the Post Office had reduced its corporation tax liability by more than £100 million by deducting payments to victims of the Horizon scandal from its profits. Tax expert Dan Neidle maintained that claiming tax relief for this compensation could be a breach of the law, could mean that the business was at risk of insolvency, and that senior executives may have been overpaid. The BBC highlighted notes in the most recent accounts that stated that the Post Office was "engaged in discussions with HMRC regarding potential taxation liabilities that could arise in relation to past events". Neidle said the Post Office did not have enough money to pay a £100m tax bill and could be technically insolvent. Although compensation payments seem to have been deducted from profits for tax purposes, the BBC report said they appeared to have been ignored when calculating executive pay. In the year ended 2022 the CEO was paid a salary of £436,000 and a profit-related bonus of £137,000. Neidle said:

Bonuses have been paid to the executive team based on an apparent level of profitability which does not exist. If a public company missed an obvious tax point that made the business insolvent the shareholders would be demanding the CFO and CEO's head on a platter.

=== National Federation of Subpostmasters ===
Throughout the scandal the National Federation of SubPostmasters (NFSP), which was wholly funded by the Post Office, insisted that Horizon was "robust". In February 2015, George Thomson, general secretary of the NFSP, told a House of Commons committee:

We have to be careful, that we are not creating a cottage industry that damages the brand and makes clients like the DWP and the DVLA think twice. The DWP would not have re-awarded the Post Office card account contract, which pays out £18 billion a year, in the last month if they thought for a minute that this computer system was not reliable... If we are not careful, we damage the brand, we damage the franchise and we cost my members' ability to sell the franchise. If we lose big contracts, [other] members lose their jobs as well. So we have to be careful that we do not create a cottage industry that is built on supposition.

The federation was criticised by the judge in the Bates case: "the NFSP is not remotely independent of the Post Office, nor does it appear to put its members' interests above its own separate commercial interests". At the Horizon Inquiry, the NFSP submitted in June 2023 that it had been continually deceived by the Post Office as to the design, integration and integrity of the Horizon system.

== Post Office IT systems ==
A 2020 article in Private Eye described the origins of Horizon:

Conceived in 1996 as one of the first private finance initiative (PFI) contracts, between the Post Office and the Benefits Agency on the one hand and computer company ICL on the other, the Horizon IT system had an unpromising start. It had been set up to create a swipe card system for payment of pensions and benefits from Post Office branch counters. When, in May 1999, the plug was finally pulled on what the Commons public accounts committee called 'one of the biggest IT failures in the public sector', taxpayers had lost around £700m. Something had to be salvaged, however. So, against the better judgement of its IT specialists, the Post Office decided to use the system to transform its paper-based branch accounting into an electronic system covering the full range of Post Office services. The new Horizon project became the largest non-military IT contract in Europe.

As of 2025, the Post Office continue to use the Horizon system, though they state that there have been "several versions" of the system and that they have "continued to make improvements" to it. Despite this, some sub-postmasters still claim the system to be unreliable. The Post Office state that they "plan to move to a new system that is being developed", but that "moving to a new system is a very large exercise" with the 11,500 post office branches they handle.

=== Versions of the Horizon system ===
There have been two main versions of the Horizon system during the period of the scandal, with radically different architectures; the first in use from 1999 until 2010, and the second from 2010 onwards.

The first, known as Legacy Horizon within the Post Office Horizon IT Inquiry, was built on the Riposte product from Escher Group Ltd, and supported offline operation with data held locally. Paul Patterson, CEO of Fujitsu Services UK, said in his first witness statement, "Legacy Horizon used Riposte software from Escher, a third-party specialist provider to post offices in other countries, to replicate data between counters at the branches and correspondence servers at the data centres".

Business applications on Legacy Horizon (including EPOSS, the accounting application) were written by Fujitsu. The history and poor state of the EPOSS software is described in 2001 in an internal Fujitsu document "Report on the EPOSS PinICL TaskForce".

The second version, known as Horizon Online or HNG-X, was a complete rewrite by Fujitsu, over several years up to 2010, using (as the name suggests) a fully online architecture, with all data held on a central database. An update to this, known as Horizon Anywhere or HNG-A, based on the same online architecture, was deployed in 2017 and is still in use in 2025.

=== Problems with the software ===
The Horizon IT system contained "hundreds" of bugs. Some of those that came to light were named after the post offices where the bug first occurred. These bugs included: the "Dalmellington bug", where the system would enter repeated withdrawals in the ledger every time the user pressed "enter" at a frozen interface screen; and the "Callendar Square bug", where the system would create duplicate database entries in the ledger.

Subpostmasters began reporting balancing errors within weeks of the Horizon system being installed, via the helpline they were instructed to use. The Post Office denied the subpostmasters' reports of faults in the system, insisted that the subpostmasters make up any shortfall of money, and in many cases falsely denied that any other subpostmasters had reported problems. In May 2002, shopkeeper Baljit Sethi raised concerns with the press that there were errors in Horizon, after his wife Anjana was notified that her subpostmaster contract would be terminated. The Post Office responded that it "totally refuted" that the system was faulty, and that it had "sent experts ... to check it twice".

In around 2000, problems with the system were reported by Alan Bates, the subpostmaster at Craig-y-Don from March 1998 until November 2003. In 2003, Bates had his contract as subpostmaster terminated when he refused to comply with Post Office policy. He reported his concerns to Computer Weekly in 2004; sufficient evidence had been gathered by 2009 to publish. A campaign group, Justice for Subpostmasters Alliance (JFSA), was formed by Bates and others in September 2009. By 2012, concern in the media, and amongst a number of members of parliament, had grown. As a result, an independent firm of forensic accountants, Second Sight, was commissioned by the Post Office to conduct an independent inquiry in 2012. During this period the chief executives of Royal Mail Group were John Roberts, Adam Crozier and Moya Greene, and then Paula Vennells, who became chief executive of the Post Office when it separated from Royal Mail in 2012.

In April 2021, Post Office chief executive Nick Read announced that the Horizon system would be replaced by a new IT system that would be "more user-friendly, easier to adapt for new products and services, and cloud-based to ensure easy maintenance and ready interoperability with other systems", and presented a plan to share Post Office profits with postmasters.

At the Inquiry in 2024, it was revealed that Fujitsu was aware that the Horizon software contained bugs as early as 1999, but this was not disclosed to the subpostmasters or to the courts in which prosecutions were conducted.

=== Horizon predecessor: Capture ===
During the period of public concern and increased press coverage of the Post Office scandal after the transmission of Mr Bates vs the Post Office in January 2024, there were complaints that a computer system named Capture, which preceded Horizon and had been rolled out to 300 post offices in 1995, had created false accounting information that led to prosecutions. Kevan Jones MP wrote to the Post Office minister, asking what the Post Office knew about Capture errors and why some subpostmasters were persecuted and prosecuted based on the Capture-generated data: "We know that the Capture software was faulty, resulting in corrupted data. We also know that the Post Office knew about these faults at the time, as it openly communicated with subpostmasters about them." The Post Office declined to answer detailed questions about Capture, leaving uncertainty about the number of subpostmasters affected. At least two subpostmasters using the system were accused of fraud, but protests that the accounting problems were a "glitch in the system" were ignored.

In December 2024, the government recognised that Capture could also have created shortfalls affecting postmasters. It commissioned an independent Kroll report into the software. As a result, Business Secretary Jonathan Reynolds promised to provide redress for postmasters who suffered losses as a result of Capture errors.

=== Horizon predecessor: Ecco+ ===
In late 2024, reports emerged of subpostmasters having been prosecuted and/or chased for payments relating to an even earlier IT system known as ECCO+, which had been used in post offices throughout the 1990s.

Ecco+ (Electronic Cash Registers at Counters) was an offline, floppy disk based EPOS system on PC hardware, which was designed for use in Crown offices (directly managed branches, as opposed to sub offices). In its later years it was also used at some subpostmaster-run branches, which had been converted from Crown offices as part of the general reduction in the directly managed network.

In October 2024, the National Federation of Subpostmasters (NFSP) requested that an investigation take place into ECCO+, and in November 2024 it was reported that the government was looking into claims that ECCO+ caused unexplained shortfalls in offices. In March 2025 the NFSP asked for former Crown office staff to come forward if they had experienced problems with ECCO+.

== Investigating Post Office IT problems ==
=== Second Sight reports ===
In 2012, forensic accountants Second Sight were appointed by the Post Office to conduct an independent investigation of the Horizon software at the request of a group of MPs and the Justice for Subpostmasters Alliance (JFSA). Second Sight issued an interim report in July 2013. Their preliminary conclusions stated that, although "[w]e have so far found no evidence of system wide (systemic) problems with the Horizon software", the Post Office was aware of the existence of at least two defects or bugs in the software, one of which had occurred at least twice before being detected and fixed, which had led to false shortfalls in accounts at 76 branches. The losses in two of these incidents had been identified by the Post Office and the subpostmasters had not been held liable, but one incident "resulted in branches being asked to make good incorrect amounts." It also identified incidents when communication and hardware issues had caused account imbalances, noted the Post Office's failure to investigate reports of IT issues, and criticised the Post Office's focus on account recovery and prosecution over discovering how shortfalls had occurred. More than 100 subpostmasters were by this time saying that they had been prosecuted or forced to repay shortfalls created by Horizon.

In April 2015, Second Sight issued a further report, titled Initial Complaint Review and Mediation Scheme, and marked as confidential. The report criticised multiple aspects of both the Horizon system and the Post Office's investigations of shortfalls. It stated that the system was prone to errors due to faulty or outdated equipment, communication errors, and lack of security; it stated "A consequence of the progressive transfer of risk from Post Office to Subpostmasters is that, in our opinion, there is little incentive for Post Office to improve the error repellency of its business systems. [...] Our investigations have shown that the majority of branch losses were caused by "errors made at the counter". Many of these errors might have been avoided, or mitigated, had more robust, error repellent, systems been introduced." It stated that Horizon had not been accurately tracking money from lottery terminals, Vehicle Excise Duty payments or cash machine transactions – and Post Office investigators had not looked for the cause of the errors, instead accusing the subpostmasters of theft or false accounting. It revealed that the Post Office was aware of the ability for technicians at Fujitsu to remotely alter branch data, without leaving an appropriate entry in the audit trail, something which subpostmasters had stated was occurring but which the Post Office had previously claimed was not possible. The report concluded:

As we have previously stated, when looking at the totality of the 'Horizon experience' we remain concerned that in some circumstances Horizon can be systemically flawed from a user's perspective and Post Office has not necessarily provided an appropriate level of support.

The report was dismissed by the Post Office, which continued to maintain there were no systemic issues with the Horizon system. George Freeman, a minister at the Department for Business, maintains that when, in 2015, he was required to read out a speech written for him stating that Horizon was reliable, he initially refused and insisted on a meeting with Paula Vennells. "She and officials told me that there was no evidence of a systemic failure in the software, and the department's lawyer insisted I mustn't accept liability for the department or Post Office". Freeman went on to make the speech in the House of Commons: "Second Sight produced two independent reports – one in 2013 and the other earlier this year [2015] – both of which found there was no evidence of systemic flaws in the system". Another minister, Stephen Timms, claimed to have been similarly duped in 2004 when he wrote a letter to MPs insisting that "[Post Office managers] have found no evidence to suggest there is any fault with the Horizon system and maintain that the decision to terminate Mr Bates' contract was legitimate.".

In 2020, Vennells, who stood down from her Post Office role in 2019, said of the 2013 report that "it concluded, while it had not found evidence of system-wide problems with the Horizon software, there were specific areas where Post Office should consider its procedures and operational support for sub-postmasters".

In December 2019, Ron Warmington of Second Sight said in a statement:

The Post Office has improperly enriched itself, through the decades, with funds that have passed through its own suspense accounts. Had its own staff more diligently investigated in order to establish who were the rightful owners of those funds, they would have been returned to them, whether they were Post Office's customers or its Subpostmasters. When is the Post Office going to return the funds that, in effect, belonged to its Subpostmasters?... It also seems to be clear now that some of those funds could have been generated by Horizon itself, or by errors made by the Post Office's own staff, or by those of Fujitsu. They weren't 'real' losses at all. They were phantom discrepancies... If the Post Office Board had believed... and acted on... what Second Sight reported... instead of being led by the nose by its own middle management and in-house and external legal advisors, huge amounts of money, and human suffering, would have been avoided.

=== Mediation scheme ===
After the publication of Second Sight's interim report, a mediation scheme for affected subpostmasters was set up in August 2013, to be funded by the Post Office and run by a working group comprising the Post Office, Second Sight and the JFSA and chaired by retired judge Sir Anthony Hooper. Hooper doubted that the subpostmasters were dishonest and thought Horizon likely at fault. By December 2014, MPs were critical of the mediation scheme and 140 had withdrawn their support for it. James Arbuthnot, who was leading the 144 MPs who had been contacted by subpostmasters about the issue, accused the organisation of rejecting 90% of applications for mediation. He said the Post Office had been "duplicitous", and suggested there would be legal and political campaigns in response.

In 2014, the Post Office board set up a sub-committee named Project Sparrow to oversee its interactions with Second Sight, JFSA and MPs. The sub-committee was led by Post Office chair Alice Perkins and included chief executive Vennells, senior in-house lawyer Chris Aujard, and Richard Callard, a senior civil servant at UK Government Investments, then a division of the Department for Business, Energy and Industrial Strategy. The project first became publicly known during the Bates & Others case under the name of the 'X Working Group'. The Post Office claimed privilege in respect both of the name of the project and some of the contents of a document referred to as the 'X Action Summary'. The Evidence-Based Justice Lab Post Office Scandal Project at the University of Exeter noted that "The judge criticises [the Post Office] for what appears to be excessive redaction, which includes concealing the name of a working group called 'X' [Project Sparrow is our assumption] and other redactions." In January 2024, the BBC obtained and published an un-redacted version of minutes from two Project Sparrow sub-committee meetings which took place in April 2014. The minutes revealed Post Office plans to sack Second Sight. In March 2015, the Post Office terminated the contract.

In February 2015 the Business, Energy and Industrial Strategy Committee was told by Angela van den Bogerd, head of partnerships at the Post Office, that the Post Office had provided Second Sight with the information they had agreed to provide at the outset. Ian Henderson, lead investigator for Second Sight, disagreed and told the committee that he had not been given access to prosecution files, which he needed to investigate his suspicions that the Post Office had brought cases against subpostmasters with "inadequate investigation and inadequate evidence". He said that these files were still outstanding 18 months after they had been requested. The working group reached a stalemate and was wound up in March 2015, 18 months after it had been set up, having reneged on its promise to include subpostmasters with convictions.

In January 2024, the BBC reported that the Post Office had threatened to sue Ian Henderson, from Second Sight, when he uncovered evidence of miscarriages of justice, saying: "If your statements go as far as to harm Post Office's reputation then we may have to take even more serious action in order to protect our brand." The report said: "The Post Office threatened and lied to the BBC in a failed effort to suppress key evidence that helped clear postmasters in the Horizon scandal".

=== Detica report ===
In October 2013, Detica undertook a detailed analysis of the Post Office's systems. It advised the Post Office that its systems were "not fit for purpose in a modern retail and financial environment".

=== Clarke advice, CK Sift Review, Altman review ===
From April 2012, the legal firm Cartwright King had a contract to handle Post Office prosecutions in England and Wales. Simon Clarke, a barrister employed by Cartwright King, was assigned his first Post Office case in April or May 2013, and on 27 June he became aware that the forthcoming Second Sight report would describe two bugs in the Horizon Online software. Clarke, wanting to know who had told Second Sight about the bugs, arranged a call the next day to Gareth Jenkins, a Fujitsu Services employee who had acted as an expert witness in several cases. Jenkins said he had declared the two bugs to Second Sight, and was confident they did not compromise Horizon's audit trail, but went on to state "you can never say there are no more bugs in the system". Clarke quickly formed a view that Jenkins should not be used in future as an expert witness, and that use of Horizon data in past cases should be reviewed. He made an ex parte public interest immunity application in the trial he was working on that was due to commence on 1 July. "The basis of the application ... was the desire to prevent a widespread loss of confidence in a public institution or, a loss of trust in a system operated by such an institution or to prevent journalistic speculation about systems relied upon by the public."

On 15 July 2013, Clarke wrote an advice to the Post Office which became known as the "Clarke advice". He reminded the Post Office of its obligations as a prosecutor regarding disclosure and of the duties of an expert witness and expressed a view that several trials had been misled as to the reliability of the Horizon system. He said that Fujitsu employee Gareth Jenkins, even though he was aware of bugs in the system, had given expert evidence to the court attesting to Horizon's accuracy.

Cartwright King then carried out the "CK Sift Review", which was in turn reviewed by Brian Altman, counsel for the Post Office. The review, which was concluded in 2014, identified 26 potential miscarriages of justice since 2010 and led to four prosecutions being halted.

The second piece of advice was written in August 2013, after Clarke became aware that the head of security at the Post Office had given instructions to shred minutes of a conference call about Horizon bugs, and again reminded the Post Office of prosecution disclosure obligations. The existence of the Clarke advice became known during the case of Hamilton & Others vs Post Office Ltd in 2021 but it remained unpublished until 2022. It was described by Lord Falconer of Thoroton, former head of the judiciary, as a likely "smoking gun".

In May 2023 the Evidence Based Justice Lab – University of Exeter published a 41-page analysis and assessment of Brian Altman's "General Review". Concluding their executive summary, Richard Moorhead, Karen Nokes and Rebecca Helm say:

There are lessons to be learned on the nature of human and professional relationships that encourage lawyers to absorb and reflect back their client's view without sufficient independence and critical detachment.

The Review demonstrated a tendency to treat with cynicism the appellants and to disregard entirely the human costs of the Post Office's conduct. This blindness to the humanity of others is sometimes reified in practice (and the Bar's Code of Conduct) as fearless advocacy. The Review stands as a monument to that approach, showing how the decision-making of the lawyers can be limited or corrupted by excessive zeal.

— Executive Summary, page 3

=== Deloitte Review ===
In 2014 auditors from Deloitte found that branch accounts could be altered remotely by Fujitsu. In February 2016 they began a further review, intending to look at Horizon transactions since its launch in 1999, but the Post Office halted their work four months later on legal advice after the subpostmasters had launched their group action.

== Exposing the IT problems ==
In 2004, Bates approached Computer Weekly investigative journalist Tony Collins over suspicions about the Horizon IT system. Five years elapsed before the journalists felt able to 'stand up' the story. Horizon was legally declared unreliable in Bates & Others v Post Office Ltd, in 2018. The unlawful nondisclosure of knowledge by the Post Office in its prosecution cases was established in law in the case of Hamilton & Others vs Post Office Ltd, in 2021.

In September 2015, Baroness Neville-Rolfe, on behalf of the government, instructed the incoming Post Office chairman Tim Parker to "determine whether any further action is necessary ... to respond to the concerns about Horizon raised by individuals and MPs". Parker commissioned a public law barrister, Jonathan Swift, to investigate. The resulting document was written by two authors, Swift and barrister Christopher Knight, and became known as the Swift Review. The report was completed in February 2016 but was not shared with the Post Office board, and not made public until a Freedom of Information request was successful in August 2022.

In an analysis of the Swift Review, the Evidence-Based Justice Lab Post Office Scandal Project at the University of Exeter said:

The Swift Review revealed to the PO Chairman that secret remote access to Horizon was possible in 2016. The Chairman discussed the review with PO's General Counsel (Macloed). The Bates litigation, roundly criticised by the High Court judge dealing with it for being misleading, was founded in part, until 2019, on the basis that secret remote access was not possible. Given Macloed and Parker were involved in the litigation, and it appears to have been run on an incorrect basis that was or ought to have been known to them, the extent of that involvement it needs investigation.

The Lab also noted that Swift did not interview Anthony Hooper, chair of the Post Office's mediation committee, during the review.

The extent to which the government was aware of the Post Office's defence in the Bates case was questioned during a parliamentary debate on 19 March 2020. David Jones MP said, "Of course the Post Office has a non-executive director appointed by the Government. One must assume that that non-executive director is reporting to Ministers." Kevan Jones MP replied, "If I had been the Minister, I would have had that person in and scrutinised what was going on ... That would certainly have applied in the past few months, given the hundreds of millions of pounds that have been spent defending the indefensible." Bambos Charalambous MP said, "The Post Office seemed to have unlimited funds at its disposal to fight this action ... The Post Office is an arm's length organisation, but there seems to be no accountability ..." Chi Onwurah MP said, "Its only shareholder is the Secretary of State for Business, Energy and Industrial Strategy, so more should have been done to address the scandal before it was allowed to fester to this extent."

Arbuthnot, sitting in the House of Lords as Baron Arbuthnot of Edrom, in a written question asked "whether the Accounting Officer with responsibility for the Post Office has played any role in advising ministers on the Government's policy in relation to... the sub-postmasters' litigation against the Post Office".

In 2024, Andrew Bridgen MP said in parliament:

I was in the original Post Office review group. By 2015, a whistleblower from Fujitsu had come forward from the boiler room, as they called it. He had been altering accounts without the knowledge of the sub-postmasters. The MPs in the review group knew. The investigator from Second Sight, Ron Warmington, knew. The Post Office knew that the convictions were unsafe, as did the Government, yet it took another five years of very expensive litigation from the 555 before justice was done.

The whistleblower referred to by Bridgen was Richard Roll. Roll worked in Fujitsu's support operations in the early 2000s. His evidence became crucial because he directly contradicted one of the Post Office's long-standing claims: that branch accounts could not be altered remotely. Rolls told forensic investigator Ron Warmington "The system was pretty full of holes when I was there. The guys I was working with were just legalised hackers, and they could crack anything." Roll's evidence can be viewed on the official inquiry video recording.

== Bates & Others v Post Office Ltd ==
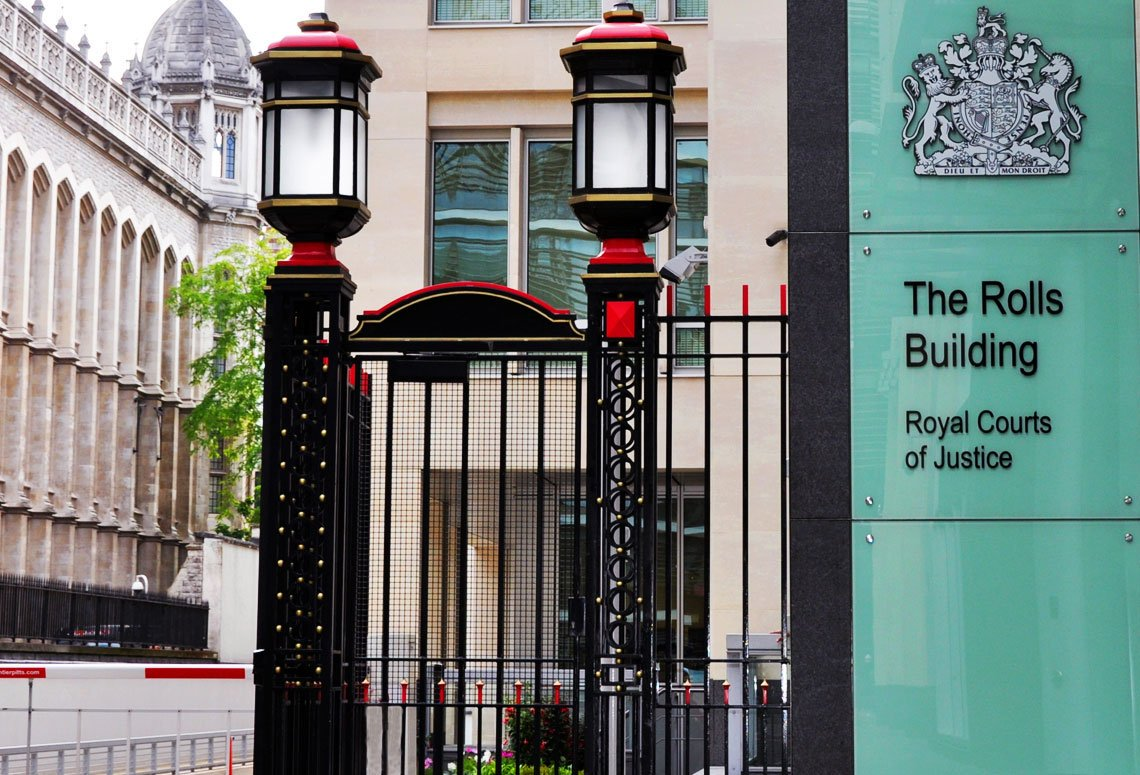
The case was heard at the Rolls Building

When mediation with the Post Office broke down, the subpostmasters began to consult and combine their efforts into legal action. The action taken against the Post Office took the form first of group litigation in the name of Bates and others, a civil action in the High Court by some 555 people. There were six lead claimants, and 23 common issues (that is issues common to all the cases) were identified and agreed to enable the court to examine the 555 cases. The case was settled mid-trial by consent and without judgment as to costs; Post Office costs have been estimated as £100m and those of the subpostmasters as £47m. The Post Office agreed to pay the subpostmasters £58 million, but after legal costs the claimants were left with £12 million to share.

During the trial, which had been divided into a number of sub-trials, those acting for the Post Office attempted to persuade the judge to recuse himself. Journalist and writer Nick Wallis, commenting on the two very senior lawyers who had advised the Post Office Board on the strategy, described it as "misuse (of) a very serious instrument designed to aid fairness as a weapon purely for their wealthy client's benefit". At the Horizon inquiry, a former Post Office manager admitted that the ultimately lost case was seen by the Post Office as a way of "killing off" challenges to the Horizon system. Kathleen Donnelly, one of the barristers who acted for the subpostmasters in the case, said:

It is obvious that the Post Office had a strategy to withhold material until they were forced to produce it. This caused delay, disruption and ran up costs. We only received significant documents after a battle and were left with little time to review them, sometimes just days before a witness was cross-examined. It was exasperating.

On 22 March 2017, Senior Master Fontaine made a group litigation order (GLO) with the approval of the president of the Queen's Bench of the High Court and, on 31 March, the then Mr Justice Fraser was nominated managing judge in Bates & Others v Post Office Ltd, brought by 555 claimants. At the start of the proceedings, the Post Office unsuccessfully opposed the making or the existence of a group litigation order. The Post Office had set up a litigation sub-committee, attended on 24 April 2019 by Tim Parker, Tom Cooper (director of UK Government Investments), David Cavender, Alisdair Cameron, Ben Foat, staff from Womble Bond Dickinson and from Herbert Smith Freehills. There was an unsuccessful application by the Post Office that the judge recuse himself, an appeal, and two separate submissions described by judges as attempts to put the courts in terrorem. At the Judgment No. 6 the judge said:

The recusal application was issued the day after Mr Godeseth's cross-examination had made it clear, not only that this remote access existed, but after he was taken in careful cross-examination through specific examples of Fujitsu personnel manipulating branch accounts, and leading to discrepancies in branch accounts. I am aware that criticism of the Post Office and Fujitsu in this respect may prove to be controversial, as earlier criticism of certain aspects of the Post Office's case in Judgment (No. 3) was not well received by it. However, if criticism is justified, I consider it would be detrimental to proper resolution of the group litigation if that criticism were to be withheld simply because it might lead to a further negative reaction by the Post Office. It is also an inherent part of the judicial function in any litigation to make findings, which may include criticisms where justified, that may be contrary to a litigant's own view of the merits of their case. Some litigants are so convinced of the righteousness of their own position that they consistently refuse to accept any possible view of the litigation other than their own. Such a blinkered view is rarely helpful, and would be particularly unhelpful from a publicly owned institution.

The subpostmasters were financed by a litigation fund, Therium. The high cost of High Court battles means that some cases may not make it to court without them. The matter ended by consent when the Post Office agreed to pay costs of £58 million, without admitting liability, and compensation was therefore not awarded. Of that payment, £46 million went to the financial backers.

Vennells, the then-Post Office chief executive, in December 2019, after the Post Office conceded the court cases, apologised to workers affected by the scandal, saying: "I am truly sorry we were unable to find both a solution and a resolution outside of litigation and for the distress this caused." In a letter to the Business, Energy and Industrial Strategy (BEIS) Select Committee she wrote:

The message that the Board and I were consistently given by Fujitsu, from the highest levels of the company, was that while, like any IT system, Horizon was not perfect and had a limited life-span, it was fundamentally sound. [para. 7(11)] ...

I raised this question [of remote access] repeatedly, both internally and with Fujitsu, and was always given the same answer: that it was not possible for branch records to be altered remotely without the subpostmaster's knowledge. Indeed, I remember being told by Fujitsu's then CEO when I raised it with him that the system was "like Fort Knox". [para. 54, response to question 14]

— Vennells (June 2020). "Letter to BEIS Select Committee". pp. 4, 15–16

During the case, six separate judgments were handed down, two of them (POL-subpostmaster contract common issues, and Horizon system issues) dealing with substantive matters, while the other four dealt with procedural matters.

== Appeals against convictions ==
The ruling in Bates & Others v Post Office Ltd that the Horizon software contained "bugs, errors, and defects" that could cause shortfalls paved the way for subpostmasters to have their convictions overturned. In March 2020, the Criminal Cases Review Commission (CCRC) announced that it was referring thirty-nine cases for appeal on the grounds that their prosecutions were an abuse of process. More referrals followed and in May 2021 the Law Society Gazette reported that the organisation was 'not adequately resourced' if 200 cases were to be brought forward for review.

The Post Office states that the total number of all overturned convictions, as of 2 February 2024, is 101. This includes eight cases in which Post Office was not the prosecutor. Of the 147 completed cases, 37% were refused permission to appeal or withdrawn from Court.

In August 2023 the chair of the Horizon Compensation Advisory Board, Christopher Hodges, wrote to the CCRC setting out the view of the Board. "Our strong belief is that the overwhelming majority of convictions of Sub-Post-Masters and -Mistresses (SPMs) related to Horizon, and possibly also a significant number of those not directly related to Horizon, are unjust." The letter was also sent to all UK statutory prosecuting authorities.

The Times on 7 January 2024 reported that Alex Chalk, the justice secretary, was looking at whether the Post Office can be stripped of its role in the appeals process, with many victims still attempting to overturn wrongful convictions. On 9 January 2024 Nick Read, Post Office's chief executive, wrote to ministers saying it would stand by the prosecution of more than half of the post office operators targeted during the Horizon scandal: it would be "bound to oppose" appeals in 369 cases. In the letter, Read wrote: "This clearly raises acute political, judicial, and communications challenges against the very significant public and parliamentary pressure for some form of acceleration or by-passing of the normal appeals process."

Moorhead, a member of the Horizon Compensation Advisory Board, posted his thoughts on what was wrong with the Post Office appeal cases in his online newsletter:

I'm not going to rehearse all the arguments and why we think the legitimate concerns about our proposals can and should be met. But I do want to add one point of general interest. That point also addresses the extent to which some would like to portray the hear [sic] of the Post Office Scandal as having occurred in a different decade ... [T]he Post Office tried to resist the Court Appeal hearing Ground 2 in November 2020. They did so knowing that if they were successful, the evidence of serious wrongdoing available to the court ... would be less likely to be made public.

When that failed, the Post Office then resisted Ground 2 as a "damage limitation strategy", Moorhead illustrates his assessment of the Post Office's approach:

Okay, the PR line would have gone, we were a terrible prosecutor but only in a tiny number of cases. They resisted Ground 2 partly on the basis that prosecution misconduct was limited to a particular period of time. What has emerged only recently is that the solicitors acting for the Post Office took the unusual but professionally proper (and to be applauded) step of reporting Post Office in-house lawyers for misconduct between 1999–2013. These concerns in other words were not time-bound. The report was not disclosed to the appellants as far as we can tell from public information.

=== R v Christopher Trousdale & Others – December 2020 ===
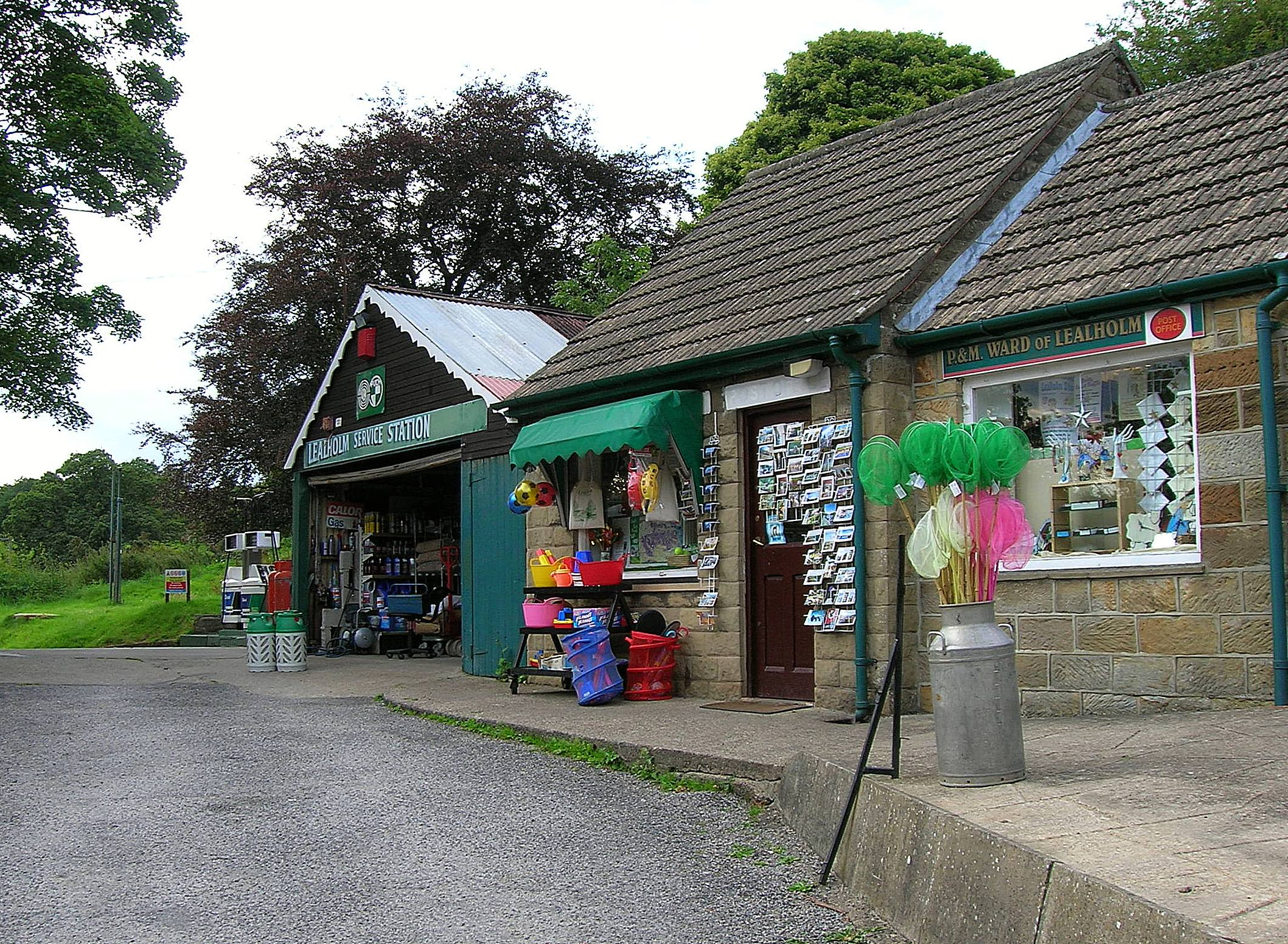
Trousdale's post office

The first subpostmaster appeals against convictions were heard at Southwark Crown Court before circuit judge Taylor, sitting as a deputy judge of the High Court. The six cases were from magistrates' court convictions for theft, fraud and false accounting in London, Luton, Basingstoke, Oxford, Burton-upon-Trent and Scarborough between 2004 and 2012. The Post Office did not oppose the appeals and apologised for what they called "historical failings". At the end of the hearing the judge said, "I am sure that all of the appellants are grateful for the approach that the Post Office has taken finally to this matter and that it can be put to rest for them."

=== Hamilton & Others vs Post Office Ltd – April 2021 ===
In April 2021, after an appeal before three judges, Lord Justice Holroyde, Mr Justice Picken and Mrs Justice Farbey, thirty-nine of the convicted former postmasters had their convictions quashed. The case was heard over four days in March 2021. The forty-two appellants were represented by seven teams of barristers; the Post Office representatives were led by Brian Altman QC.

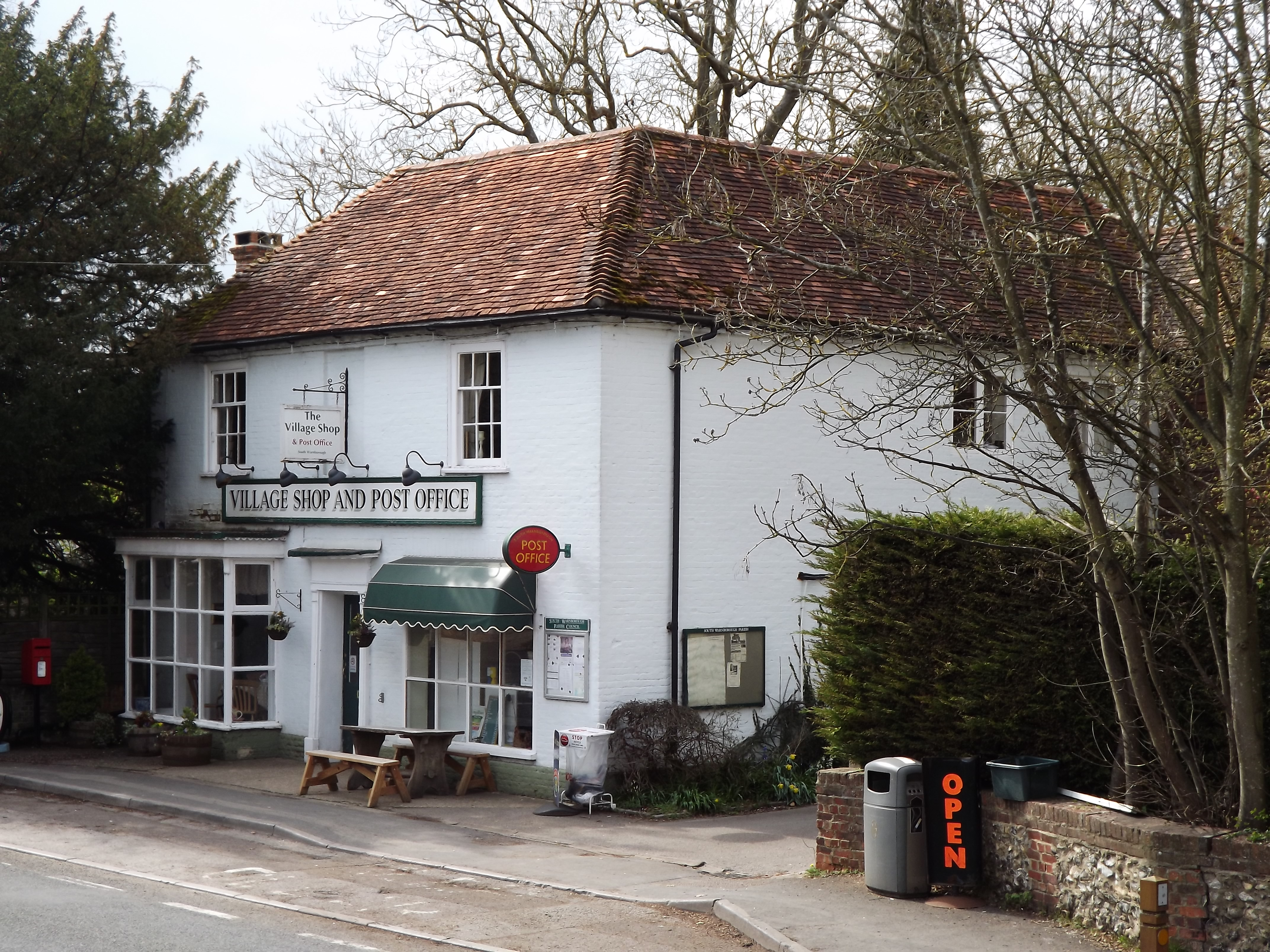
Hamilton's post office

Forty-two historical convictions of dishonesty had been referred by the CCRC to the Court of Appeal:

The CCRC referred the cases because it considered that two cogent lines of argument in relation to abuse of process were available to each appellant: first, that the reliability of Horizon data was essential to the prosecution and conviction, and it was not possible for the trial process to be fair; and secondly, that it was an affront to the public conscience for the appellant to face criminal proceedings.

Each of the forty-two cases was considered individually. Of the forty-two, just two had previously appealed, unsuccessfully. The Post Office accepted Fraser's findings of the unreliability of the Horizon systems and, in some cases, of inadequate investigation, and/or of insufficient disclosure. In these cases, the Post Office did not resist the appeal on first ground but it would oppose the second ground. The Post Office divided the appellants into three groups: group A, four cases where it asserted that both categories 1 and 2 abuse of process applied; group B, 35 cases where category 1 applied, but not category 2; and group C, where neither category applied. The Post Office would not seek a retrial of any appellant whose appeal was allowed. Counsel for three of the appellants argued that:

the court must act judicially. It would be wrong in principle for the court to permit the respondent (the Post Office) effectively to preclude argument on Ground 2 by its concession that Ground 1 is not opposed. ... The appellants have suffered very severely as a consequence of their prosecutions, and a finding in their favour on Ground 1 alone would not fully vindicate them. ... there has been an important disclosure since the Commission referred the cases, and submitted that the public interest required consideration of the complete picture.

For the other applicants, it was submitted all were concerned about delay:

only three ... had actively sought to argue Ground 2 ... appellants would be content to have their appeals allowed on Ground 1 alone ... however, appellants do contend that Ground 2 is made out in their cases ... if the court concluded that argument should be heard on Ground 2, they would wish their submissions on Ground 2 heard.

The court ordered that, "in the exercise of the court's discretion we would permit argument on Ground 2 by any appellant who wished to advance it. In the event, each appellant did wish to do so." The court set out its reasoning and highlighted four factors of particular importance:

1. issues of abuse of the process of the court are important matters of concern to the appellants and the respondent, and are also matters of public interest ... notwithstanding that the appellants had not previously applied for leave to appeal.
2. Ground 1 presupposes ... that there should be a prosecution ... the public may legitimately feel ... that a finding in the appellant's favour on Ground 2 adds materially to a finding in his or her favour on Ground 1 ... If in fact an appellant should never have been prosecuted at all ... the court should make that determination.
3. We are ... satisfied that appropriate case management can avoid any risk of these appeals becoming an open-ended exercise in finding facts.
4. Fourthly, we do not accept the submissions that consideration of Ground 2 will cause undue delay in the determination of these appeals ...

At the April hearings, after considering the submissions of the subpostmasters and the Post Office, the court stated, "In those circumstances, we are satisfied that a fair trial was not possible in any of the 'Horizon cases' and that Ground 1 accordingly succeeds in each of those cases." The court decided that Ground 2 succeeded in each of the "Horizon cases".

In November 2020, Altman drew the court's attention to the leaking of the Clarke advice to the police and a journalist by Marshall and Flora Page, who were acting for three of the appellants. Marshall and Page resigned from the case under the threat of possible contempt of court proceedings. The threat was lifted in April 2021.

The thirty-nine appellants whose convictions were quashed included:

- Noel Thomas, who had worked for the Royal Mail for 42 years, ran the village post office in Gaerwen on the Isle of Anglesey in Wales. He was convicted of false accounting in 2006, when a Horizon error showed a shortfall of £48,000 in his accounts. He spent 13 weeks in prison and was disqualified as a local councillor. After his conviction was overturned he was honoured by Anglesey County Council in 2022.
- Jo Hamilton, who ran the village post office in South Warnborough, Hampshire, first noticed problems with the Horizon system in 2005 and in 2006 was prosecuted for a Horizon shortfall of £36,000; she pleaded guilty to false accounting in order to avoid going to prison on a theft charge. She was told by the Post Office that she was the only one having problems with Horizon and had to pay them for the Horizon shortfall. Hamilton, alongside Monica Dolan who played her in the ITV drama series Mr Bates vs The Post Office, presented one of the awards at the Brit Awards 2024. She thanked the public for their support and said: "despite what the government says, they're not paying the postmasters".
- Rubbina Shaheen, who ran Greenfields post office in Shrewsbury, was jailed for 12 months in 2010 due to an error caused by Horizon. She and her husband lost their home and had to sleep in a van, before being helped by a local charity. After her conviction was overturned she was able to make a donation out of her interim compensation payment to the charity that had helped them.
- Seema Misra ran a post office in West Byfleet in Surrey and was prosecuted by the Post Office when her Horizon accounts showed a false shortfall of more than £70,000. She was convicted of theft and sent to prison when pregnant. A few days before Misra's trial began in October 2010, three Post Office solicitors, Rob Wilson, Jarnail Singh and Juliet McFarlane, had been told about a bug in Horizon but had not disclosed the information to Misra's defence team. The solicitors have been reported to the Solicitors Regulation Authority. It was part of a much larger failure of disclosure on the part of the Post Office, a failure that cost Misra a fair trial. Giving evidence at the Horizon IT Inquiry, Warwick Tatford, the barrister who had represented the Post Office at Misra's trial, acknowledged the failures of disclosure and said that he was ashamed to have been part of the case. He also acknowledged failures in how Fujitsu engineer Gareth Jenkins was instructed as an expert witness. Misra, recalling the moment when she was sentenced to 15 months in prison in 2010, said, "It's hard to say but I think that if I had not been pregnant, I would have killed myself." Post Office solicitor Singh meanwhile sent a celebratory email to Post Office managers, in which he said: "it is to be hoped the case will set a marker to dissuade other defendants from jumping on the Horizon-bashing bandwagon".

=== Criticism and assessment of Hamilton ===
In October 2023, Moorhead, Nokes and Helm observed how relatively general the court had been in its consideration of the wrongs in Hamilton. They emphasised lack of enquiry within the proceeding and the need to find out what had happened and why, and concluded that the Hamilton appeal itself requires investigation:

It is possible to see the cases not as an aberration corrected, if belatedly, by the appeal system, but as symptomatic of a deeper malaise... The Hamilton appeal judgments are again too superficial, despite their acuity and strength of criticism, to stand as the last word on accountability for these failings. It is not good enough to say that the POL prosecution strategies were flawed and failed without also identifying the lines of accountability. After all someone devised the strategy, someone signed it off, someone designed it, someone implemented it and someone managed it; others then endorsed it, defended it and protected it. Those people need to account for their actions and justify what was done.

Marshall criticised the Court of Appeal in Hamilton for "having done nothing more than the bare minimum that was required to determine – and adjudicate upon – the outcome of the appeals."

Hamilton itself was largely (in effect exclusively) based upon the CCRC's reading of Fraser J's Horizon Issues judgment. That judgment in turn was necessarily only on preliminary issues in the Bates litigation. As is elsewhere noted, Fraser J knew only the half-of-it and was in any event, as his judgment made clear, only concerned with Horizon – and the Post Office's contention that it was a reliable and robust system. Horizon was only one of a raft of problems confronting the Post Office from 2013 – but the only one to have been judicially considered. The Post Office and the government have latched on to the Court of Appeal's approach and treat it in effect as determinative that issues and claims other than arising out of Horizon shortfalls are outwith compensation arrangements. The analysis, and therefore the conclusion, are both arguably flawed.

Marshall argues that the court followed, in the absence of argument and relevant evidence, a "dichotomy/taxonomy" canvassed by the CCRC for those appeals that it considered to be "Horizon cases" and those that were not "Horizon cases". It ought, argues Marshall, to have considered why, in so many instances, "innocent people had been wrongly convicted on seriously incomplete and unsatisfactory evidence, and had as a result became victims of the miscarriage of justice on a scale hitherto unknown". Marshall refers to the deficits in the Bates judgements due, he says, to the inadequate disclosure by the Post Office during the progress of Bates and in the Hamilton appeals.

The default position appears to be 'if not a Horizon shortfall case' the Post Office's prosecution was unimpeachable and its evidence has been treated as reliable and the resulting conviction not 'unsafe' – the litmus test for a successful appeal. The remaining 39 appeals were, in every instance, allowed on both grounds of appeal – i.e. 'first' and 'second' category abuse of process of the court by the Post Office as prosecuting authority. The second is the very serious conclusion that the Post Office was engaged in conduct likely to undermine the criminal justices system and/or public confidence in it. The essential distinction is that if a person was prosecuted on the sole basis of evidence in their Horizon account, then the appeal against conviction has been allowed ... but if that was not the sole/only basis for their prosecution and other data/evidence was available as the basis for a prosecution, the appeals failed ... Further, it appears to be the case ... that appeals have only been allowed by appeal courts where the Post Office has accepted that there were disclosure failures in connection with Horizon ... The Post Office failed to give important and highly relevant disclosure in Bates: Ismay was not disclosed, the Post Office's board's notification to its insurers of risk in 2013 was not disclosed, and Detica's October 2013 report ... was not disclosed.

Marshall cites Detica's report as the "most important single document that appears not to have been disclosed in that (GLO) litigation". The report "advised the Post Office that its systems were 'not fit for purpose' in a modern retail environment".

This issue was addressed by Lord Arbuthnot at the Business and Trade Committee on 16 January 2024:

Since those cases were referred to the Court of Appeal, things have come out within the public inquiry about the investigators' behaviour and about the Post Office's entire approach to the ethics of prosecution, which I believe take us way beyond the application of Horizon data ... Those whose cases were overturned may need to be told 'You have to go back to the Court of Appeal, but you will do so with Government assistance, with legal aid, so that these things can be overturned by the Court of Appeal.' I think that is still up for bottoming out, and we have not come to any firm conclusion on it.

== Exoneration ==
=== Legislation ===
==== Post Office (Horizon System) Offences Act 2024 and Post Office (Horizon System) Compensation Act 2024 ====
Post Office (Horizon System) Compensation Act 2024 (Note: Section 2.)
- Act of Parliament
- Parliament of the United Kingdom
- Long title: An Act to provide for the payment out of money provided by Parliament of expenditure incurred by the Secretary of State under, or in connection with, schemes or other arrangements to compensate persons affected by the Horizon system and in respect of other matters identified in legal proceedings relating to the Horizon system.
- Citation: 2024 c. 1
- Introduced by: Kevin Hollinrake, Minister for Enterprise, Markets and Small Business, 19 December 2023; (Commons)
- Territorial extent: United Kingdom

Dates
- Royal assent: 25 January 2024
- Commencement: 25 January 2024 (Note: The Acts of Parliament (Commencement) Act 1793.)
Other legislation
Relates to	Post Office (Horizon System) Offences Act 2024; Post Office (Horizon System) Offences (Scotland) Act 2024

Status: Current legislation

History of passage through Parliament

Text of statute as originally enacted

Post Office (Horizon System) Offences Act 2024 (Note: Section 12.)
- Act of Parliament
- Parliament of the United Kingdom
- Long title: An Act to provide for the quashing of convictions in England and Wales and Northern Ireland for certain offences alleged to have been committed while the Horizon system was in use by the Post Office; to make provision about the deletion of cautions given in England and Wales or Northern Ireland for such offences; and for connected purposes.
- Citation: 2024 c. 14
- Territorial extent: England and Wales; Northern Ireland; (Note: Section 11(1).)

Dates
- Royal assent: 24 May 2024
- Commencement: 24 May 2024 (Note: Section 11(2).)
Other legislation
Relates to	Post Office (Horizon System) Compensation Act 2024; Post Office (Horizon System) Offences (Scotland) Act 2024

Status: Current legislation

History of passage through Parliament

Text of statute as originally enacted

This is one of the greatest miscarriages of justice in our nation's history. People who worked hard to serve their communities had their lives and reputations destroyed, through absolutely no fault of their own. The victims must get justice and compensation... But today I can announce that we will introduce new primary legislation to make sure that those convicted as a result of the Horizon scandal are swiftly exonerated and compensated.

— Rishi Sunak, Hansard, volume 743, column 289, 10 January 2024.

On 10 January 2024, Prime Minister Rishi Sunak announced the government's intention to introduce legislation to exonerate wrongly convicted Post Office branch managers and said there would be a "new upfront payment of £75,000 for some of those affected". However, the new legislation would aim to ensure that any subpostmaster guilty of criminal wrongdoing was still subject to prosecution. Kevin Hollinrake, the Post Office minister, said that all those claiming compensation would have to sign a "statement of truth" to confirm they had not committed the crimes of which they were accused. He explained, "Anyone subsequently found to have signed such a statement untruthfully will be putting themselves at risk of prosecution or fraud." The BBC described the proposal as 'unprecedented', with a number of possible problems that might make implementation difficult.

David Davis MP warned that the plans would fail to distinguish between the genuinely innocent majority and the guilty minority. He suggested that former Supreme Court judges be brought out of retirement to exonerate innocent postmasters. Solicitor Joshua Rozenberg commented on 15 February that five weeks after the prime ministerial statement there had been no bill, no draft, and no consultation paper. Rozenberg had speculated that the courts would respect whatever legislation Parliament might pass but, on 15 February thought that remarks made by the Lady Chief Justice, Sue Carr, Baroness Carr of Walton-on-the-Hill, at the Justice Committee on 16 January and at a press conference on 6 February indicated otherwise. The Chief Justice had been asked by the Justice Secretary to 'speak urgently' with him and had two short conversations. But, said the Chief Justice, "any suggestion that the judiciary has given any proposed legislation the green light is simply not true." Carr added that it was not for the judiciary to comment on the wisdom of proposed legislation. Haroon Siddique, writing in The Guardian, said "By not mincing her words on... the Post Office mass exoneration plans, Carr has shown a commitment to protecting the independence of the judiciary against government interference."

On 22 February, the minister announced the detail of the proposed legislation in both houses of Parliament. In a letter of the same date to the chair of the Justice Select Committee, Sir Robert Neill MP, the justice minister and the business minister wrote jointly that the legislation would include victims of pilot schemes as well as of Horizon.

Rozenberg commented that the proposed legislation would present problems to those "who want to show that their convictions have now been quashed". Writing for the Law Society Gazette, Rozenberg compared the proposed legislation to the Policing and Crime Act 2017 that awarded pardons. On BBC radio's Law in Action, Moorhead recognised the radical nature of the proposed legislation but explained that the need to exonerate the victims of the scandal "at pace" was imperative, to enable compensation to be paid quickly. The former president of the Council of HM Circuit Judges, Isobel Plumstead, criticised the proposal as dangerous: "if you do it once you can do it again". She said, "It is overriding the whole judicial system. It will inevitably lead to pressure for action in respect of other findings in criminal cases where a sort of moral right to exoneration is urged." Barrister Sam Fowles wrote in an opinion piece in The Guardian:

The government could give the commission and the courts the resources to investigate outstanding wrongful convictions. But this would risk exposing more Post Office wrongdoing and/or highlight the long-term flaws in the justice system that allowed false prosecutions to go on for so long. Instead, the government is sweeping the whole thing under the carpet by overturning all the convictions in one fell swoop. But it's a transparently political manoeuvre. Ministers (despite knowing about the scandal for years) showed no interest in mass exoneration until it saw a political upside. This sets a dangerous precedent, overturning criminal convictions based on political opportunism rather than justice, fact, and law.

The Post Office (Horizon System) Offences Bill was introduced into Parliament on 13 March 2024 and approved on 23 May. It received royal assent the next day, and the Post Office (Horizon System) Offences Act 2024 (c. 14) came into force immediately. The legislation makes provision to quash the Horizon-related convictions of subpostmasters and others in England, Wales and Northern Ireland who were prosecuted by the Post Office or the Crown Prosecution Service, including those who are no longer alive. The government announced that those whose convictions are quashed by the act will be eligible for compensation via a scheme administered by the Department for Business and Trade rather than by the Post Office. The government had set aside £1bn for compensation to victims of the Post Office scandal in 2021. In January 2024, after the announcement of the exoneration bill, Downing Street confirmed that it expected compensation to exceed £1bn; authorisation to pay the compensation was given by Parliament in the Post Office (Horizon System) Compensation Act 2024 (c. 1).

==== Post Office (Horizon System) Offences (Scotland) Act 2024 ====
Post Office (Horizon System) Offences (Scotland) Act 2024 (Note: Section 11.)
- Act of the Scottish Parliament
- Parliament of Scotland
- Long title: An Act of the Scottish Parliament to provide for the quashing of certain convictions for offences of dishonesty connected to the carrying on of a post office business at a time when the Horizon system was in use; to provide for the deletion of details of alternatives to prosecution in relation to such offences; and for connected purposes.
- Citation: 2024 asp 6
- Territorial extent: Scotland

Dates
- Royal assent: 13 June 2024
- Commencement: 14 June 2024 (Note: Section 10.)
Other legislation
Relates to	Post Office (Horizon System) Offences Act 2024

Status: Current legislation

Text of statute as originally enacted

The Scottish Government criticised the UK legislation not covering Scotland.

The Scottish Parliament passed similar legislation, the Post Office (Horizon System) Offences (Scotland) Act 2024 (asp 6), on 30 May 2024.

== Redress and compensation ==
There are three schemes for different groups of victims: the overturned convictions scheme for those who were convicted; the Horizon shortfall scheme for those who suffered losses but were not convicted; and the GLO scheme for those who took part in the group litigation.

The Horizon shortfall scheme, originally named the historic shortfall scheme, was established by the agreement between the Post Office and the 555 subpostmasters in Bates & Others v Post Office Ltd. It was designed to compensate subpostmasters who had lost money due to shortfalls caused by Horizon, but had not taken part in the group action and had not been convicted. The scheme is administered by the Post Office. By 15 January 2024 the scheme had received 2,753 eligible claims and paid out £93 million to more than 2,172 claimants.

In December 2019, at about the time of the high court verdict in Bates & Others v Post Office, the government decided this group could not apply for compensation through the historic shortfall scheme. The details of the settlement between the subpostmasters and the Post Office were not made public until August 2020. In February 2022, MPs from parliament's Business, Energy and Industrial Strategy (BEIS) committee expressed concerns about the time taken to make settlements to former Post Office operators who were wrongfully convicted and warned that compensation needed to be concluded urgently, as many of those affected by the long-running scandal are elderly, some having died while awaiting redress, while others remained at risk of losing their homes.

In April 2021, Nick Read, Post Office chief executive, urged the government to provide funding for compensation, saying "The Post Office simply does not have the financial resources to provide meaningful compensation." Shortly afterward, the government promised "fair and speedy" pay-outs for the 555 victims of the Horizon IT scandal who had been excluded from the Post Office's compensation scheme.

In July 2021, the government announced that subpostmasters wrongly convicted of offences would get interim compensation of up to £100,000.

On 22 March 2022, a government scheme was launched to compensate the 555 subpostmasters at the same level of compensation as subpostmasters who had had their convictions overturned.

In December 2022, the Horizon Inquiry heard from Tim Moloney KC that some postmasters who had been made bankrupt after being wrongly prosecuted were receiving a fraction of what they were due. The Law Society Gazette reported:

Moloney explained [an] applicant had run a successful postmaster business for 20 years before his life was ruined by a false conviction which led to his mental health deteriorating and his being unable to pay his mortgage. In another case, a victim's award of £25,000 was reduced to £4,500 after deductions paid to the official receiver. The barrister added: "It appears that the shortfall scheme takes no account of whether the root cause of the bankruptcy was or may have been generated by the Horizon software. Compensation is intended to put the claimant in the position they would have been if they had not been adversely affected ... many of the debts accrued by these people which led to bankruptcy were caused by the shortfalls [wrongly flagged up by Horizon]" ... The compensation award is then 'swallowed up' by legal obligations to repay debts.

In March 2023 Marshall, in a submission to the Horizon Inquiry, criticised the structure of the compensation schemes and their lack of independence. He writes that, since English company law requires the board of a company to act in the interests of its shareholders, the Post Office is bound to act in the government's interests and keep compensation paid to as little as possible and that "averments by the Post Office about its concern for fairness require to be read against that legal constraint". He writes: "There should be independence at the point where an applicant for compensation engages – not once there is 'an issue'. Compensation paid will tend to be skewed in favour of the Post Office/the government." He points out that the three compensation schemes are administered respectively by the Post Office's solicitors; by the Post Office's owner; and by the Post Office itself. He writes that the scheme for those with overturned convictions "is not compensation but is the continuation of litigation. The most grievously harmed victims of the Post Office remain locked in adversarial litigation." Those who do not have convictions, he writes, become "engaged in a quasi-inquisitorial process". Marshall illustrates his argument of non-independence and of continuance of litigation with the following example:

I recently received a letter in connection with observations made by me in January 2023 in connection with an HSS scheme claim; the author of/signatory to the letter being Mr Simon Ricaldin of the Post Office. Mr Ricaldin has overall responsibility within the Post Office for compensation. The letter was headed 'Without Prejudice'. The Post Office is in a position to determine both if and what compensation is paid. Further, no argument for the continuing participation of Herbert Smith Freehills in the operation/management or supervision of the HSS scheme is available that is capable of being reconciled with established legal principle.

Marshall accepts that the structure of the schemes was created and affected by the litigation that gave rise to the need for compensation. He writes that there is no answer to his criticism except "the Post Office's averment ... that it wishes to see fair compensation paid." Nearly 12 months later, Marshall's criticism was echoed by the Observer in January 2024: "The multiple compensation schemes being administered by the government and – extraordinarily inappropriately – by the Post Office – have become mired in bureaucracy and delay".

In September 2023, the government announced that subpostmasters who have had their convictions on the basis of Horizon evidence overturned would be offered compensation of £600,000 in full and final settlement of their claim. In March 2023, the Law Society Gazette wrote, "Journalist Nick Wallis, who wrote The Great Post Office Scandal, tweeted today that 27 claimants who would have qualified for the group litigation scheme have died waiting for compensation." In January 2024, postal affairs minister Kevin Hollinrake told the Commons the families of the 60 people who died before receiving any compensation will be able to apply for compensation in their place.

As of 11 January 2024, approximately £153 million had been paid to more than 2,700 claimants across these three schemes, with 64% of all those affected by the scandal having received full and final compensation. It is estimated that more than 4,000 people have been told they are eligible for compensation. The Guardian reported that of the 700 post office workers prosecuted in England and Wales, about 250, more than a third, have yet to respond to contact despite efforts by the Post Office and, separately, by the Criminal Cases Review Commission. In Scotland, 73 potential victims have been contacted but just 19 have so far come forward seeking review.

Those working with Horizon victims say there are obvious reasons why people have not come forward. "You have a significant number who have not come forward, either because they were so traumatised they want nothing to do with it or because they still don't realise they are entitled," said the Labour MP Kevan Jones ... Westminster's cross-party business and trade committee recently heard that just 4% of those with wrongful convictions had received compensation for their ordeal.

On 27 February 2024, Nick Read, Post Office CEO, told the Business and Trade Committee investigation into fair and fast redress for sub-postmasters that all of the original applicants to the Horizon shortfall scheme had been made offers and that he thought "in the region of 62%" had been settled. Read accepted that settlements in the overturned convictions scheme had been slow. Simon Recaldin, director responsible for compensation and disclosures, explained that closure of the Horizon shortfall scheme had been planned for March 2025, but a further 1,000 claims were made following the transmission of Mr Bates v The Post Office. The additional claims meant the closure date would have to be put back. Possible claims concerning Capture, a predecessor of Horizon that had been used by more than 1,000 subpostmasters in the 1990s, were discussed. Remediation matters director Ricaldin told the committee that, of the eight cases of people experiencing problems with the Capture system, four had resulted in convictions and were being investigated.

The committee had heard from James Hartley and Neil Hudgell, solicitors for different groups of victims. In the complex cases they had not been seeing fair offers. The process was too legalistic and offensive to a lot of postmasters. Hudgell said "there is too much lawyering going on. Everything is over-engineered." Of the Horizon shortfall scheme Hudgell said more than 2,000 cases have been settled without legal advice and in his opinion needed to be reviewed. At the end of the session Liam Byrne MP said

You have told us that there is a strong case that many of the cases that have been settled may need to be reopened. You have told us that many of the claims you are working on are so problematic that you can't accept them. You have told us that there are significant process delays, that you appear to be employing three times more lawyers than the Government on some of these schemes, and that is it going to take one to two years at the current pace to finally bring justice. Thank you very much indeed for laying that out with such clarity. That concludes this panel.

The following day, on the floor of the House, Byrne said that the Post Office chief executive had not received a clear written instruction from the Government to accelerate all the compensation schemes. Byrne called on the minister to "again reflect, when he brings his Bill before the House, on the need to eliminate the Post Office from this [compensation] process."

Kevan Jones, MP and member of the Horizon compensation advisory board, said to the Post Office Minister, during an urgent question in the House of Commons, 22 February,

If there are to be overturned convictions, they cannot just be about Horizon; they should also be about Capture. Evidence that I have put to the public inquiry and sent to the Minister yesterday clearly indicates that the scandal predates Horizon. Those affected need to be included in both the compensation scheme and among those with overturned convictions.

The minister replied that the Government is keen that those detrimentally affected are included in any compensation.

== Post Office Horizon IT Inquiry ==
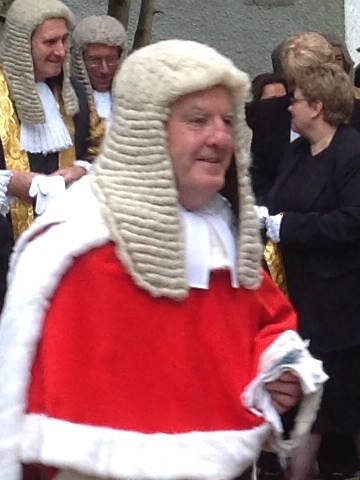
Chair of the inquiry, Sir Wyn Williams, seen in 2013

After the success of the JFSA in the Bates case against the Post Office, the organisation began to campaign to highlight the government's handling of the Post Office. The alliance raised £100,000 through crowdfunding, to complain to the Parliamentary Ombudsman that the government had failed in its duty by allowing the Post Office to wrongly prosecute SPMs. The government resisted the complaint and declared that it had been lied to.

The government resisted requests for a statutory inquiry for months before acceding to an independent inquiry. On 26 February 2020, Prime Minister Boris Johnson appeared to commit to an independent inquiry but was equivocal. Evidence of the legal costs in the Bates case was heard by parliament's Business, Energy and Industrial Strategy Committee on 10 March 2020. On 19 March 2020, in a debate in the House of Commons, Kevan Jones MP criticised former Post Office chief executive Vennells for her role in the scandal.

In a written ministerial statement on 10 June 2020, Paul Scully, minister for small business, consumers and labour markets, announced the scope of the independent review into the Post Office Horizon IT system and the trials. The terms specifically excluded the Post Office's prosecution function, the Horizon group damages settlement, and the conduct of current or future litigation. Of the review's terms of reference, Lord Arbuthnot asked in the House of Lords chamber on 6 October, "[W]hy have the Government excluded these most important things?" The minister replied that the Bates settlement agreed was full and final and the Post Office was not currently conducting any private prosecutions and had no plans to do so. After the terms of that inquiry were published, the JFSA refused to participate.

=== First round of non-statutory hearings ===
The non-statutory inquiry, now titled The Post Office Horizon IT Inquiry and led by Sir Wyn Williams, began work in autumn 2020 and issued a call for evidence on 1 December 2020. The first public hearing took place on 15 January 2021. During the non-statutory inquiry, two public hearings were held in early 2021. A preliminary hearing on the provisional List of Issues was held on 8 November 2021.

Neil Hudgell, representing SPMs, said "Now Post Office officials must face criminal investigation for maliciously ruining lives by prosecuting innocent people in pursuit of profits", and called for the prime minister to convene a judge-led inquiry. After the subpostmasters' successful appeals on both grounds one and two of abuse of process, in an article headed "Calls grow for SRA and police to investigate Post Office lawyers", Hudgell wrote that the Post Office engaged in "legal gymnastics to seek to persuade the court away from finding a clear systematic abuse of process of the criminal law", adding "the SRA and BSB [Bar Standards Board] should investigate whether anyone should be held to account amid professional concerns about who was responsible for disclosure issues". Solicitors for subpostmasters wrote to the Department for Business, Energy & Industrial Strategy asking it to re-establish the inquiry on a statutory footing and to reconsult on the terms of reference, saying: "The department should be called as witnesses under oath, not have effective control of the inquiry ... The Post Office wrongly prosecuted so many upstanding pillars of the community and its owners want to mark (their) own homework – that is unconscionable."

=== Conversion to a statutory inquiry ===
On 19 May 2021, the government announced that an extended statutory inquiry into the scandal would deliver its conclusions in autumn 2022. Sir Wyn said that the inquiry would produce a statement of approach and that, in September 2021, a further statement would set out all relevant details. The extant non-statutory inquiry was formally converted to a statutory inquiry on 1 June 2021 with additional powers, including the ability to compel witnesses and demand evidence, with potential fines or imprisonment for non-compliance. Scully said he and Sir Wyn had agreed that the context of the events had changed after convictions were quashed and hundreds more were expected to follow. Boris Johnson said in May 2021:

We must stand with postmasters to get to the bottom of what went wrong in the Post Office Horizon IT dispute. I heard first-hand the irreparable impact it has had on their lives. That's why, in light of the recent Court of Appeal judgment, we're stepping up our independent inquiry by putting it on a statutory footing, so we can get the answers they deserve.

On 28 July 2021, the Department for Business, Energy & Industrial Strategy issued its fourth statement of approach, which included the terms of reference. After setting out preliminary and organisational matters – the appointment of solicitors and counsel to the inquiry, establishment of a website and of premises, etc. – the statement set out terms, in essence:

1. Understand and acknowledge what went wrong and key lessons that must be learned.
2. Obtain all available relevant evidence from the Post Office, Fujitsu, BEIS and UKGI to establish the failings of Horizon and the Post Office's use of information from Horizon.
3. Assess whether the Post Office has learned and has delivered or made good progress on the changes necessary.
4. Assess whether the commitments made by Post Office Ltd have been properly delivered.
5. Assess whether processes and information provided by the Post Office to postmasters are sufficient.
6. Examine the historical and current governance and whistleblowing controls are now sufficient to ensure that these failures do not happen again.

The Inquiry will consider only those matters set out in the preceding sections A–F. The Inquiry will not consider any issue which is outside the scope of the powers conferred upon the Inquiry by the Inquiries Act 2005. The Horizon group damages settlement (albeit the Inquiry may examine the events leading to the settlement), and/or the engagement or findings of any other supervisory or complaints mechanisms, including in the public sector, are outside the Inquiry's scope.

On 13 February 2022, in a report prior to the start of the hearings, the BBC quoted a prosecuted, jailed and subsequently cleared subpostmaster: "I want someone else to be charged and jailed like I was." This request was later repeated by other subpostmasters.

=== Phases 1 to 4 of the Statutory Inquiry ===
The Phase 1 hearings, covering Human Impact, opened on 14 February 2022 at Juxon House in the City of London.

The Phase 2 hearings, covering the Horizon IT System procurement, design, pilot, roll out and modifications, started in October 2022. They were streamed online, as were the later phases of the inquiry. The inquiry also investigated whether the Post Office and ICL's owner, Fujitsu, knew about the faults.

Richard Moorhead, Professor of Law and Professional Ethics at the University of Exeter, said in an oral submission:

If I can end by putting the case metaphorically for a moment. Considering the Horizon saga without considering the lawyering, and without lifting professional privilege, would be a bit like considering Watergate without considering the White House Tapes. Essential, telling, [and] perhaps vital information will be missing. The abuse of power, the injustice, who did it and why, will not be properly understood. Sir, you must, to discharge the Inquiry's remit, you must do the equivalent of listening to the tapes.

Immediately after the November hearing, Williams said he would ask Post Office Limited, IT supplier Fujitsu, and the Department for Business, Energy & Industrial Strategy to waive privilege in respect of material relevant to the terms of reference, and he set a deadline for a response. On 16 November, Williams reported that all four parties had responded within the timescale specified and added "The response of POL, on any view, goes a very long way towards meeting the request I made of them. It is clear to me that in respect of many of the most crucial lines of investigation for the Inquiry POL has waived legal professional privilege." The Post Office published its response to the request on 15 November 2021. One commentator, Elisa Wahnon, wrote that although BEIS was prepared to waive privilege:

The Post Office, which is owned by BEIS, took a more cautious approach. It agreed 'as a general principle' to waive legal privilege for the purpose of the inquiry (ie a limited waiver) over relevant material but maintain privilege over documents relevant to ongoing litigation/remediation activities. Specifically, the Post Office has maintained privilege over documents relevant to the ongoing group litigation claim in the Employment Tribunal ... It has also maintained privilege over legal advice related to the Historical Shortfall Scheme and to current and anticipated claims from individuals whose criminal convictions have or will be quashed ... The decision by the Post Office to maintain privilege over certain documents could have wide-reaching ramifications for the inquiry ... If it withholds such advice on the basis that it is relevant to current and anticipated claims from those who have had their convictions quashed, this may lead to gaps in the inquiry.

The Phase 3 hearings, covering operational issues, were held between January and March 2023.

Phase 4 hearings, covering action against sub-postmasters and others, were held between July 2023 and January 2024. In the course of these hearings, Paul Patterson, director of Fujitsu services in Europe, admitted there were "bugs, errors and defects" with the Horizon software "right from the very start" and reiterated the firm's apology for its part in the scandal.

=== Interim report ===
The inquiry issued an interim report on 17 July 2023. Its eight recommendations were:

1. The Horizon Compensation Advisory Board (HCAB) should not be prevented from monitoring individual cases.
2. The HCAB shall produce written reports in respect of each of their meetings.
3. The HCAB shall consider whether full and fair compensation is being paid.
4. Membership of HCAB should be increased to ensure that it has sufficient capacity.
5. The government should within 28 days seek directions under section 306 of the Insolvency Act 1986 to ensure that compensation payable to bankrupt claimants is not diverted to insolvency practitioners.
6. The government should publish proposals for ensuring that applicants to all schemes are treated equally and fairly with regard to income tax, capital gains tax and inheritance tax.
7. The government should ensure that legislation is enacted to allow compensation under group litigation orders to be made to applicants after midnight on 7 August 2024.
8. No applications for compensation to the Horizon Shortfall Scheme should be entertained after such date as agreed by the minister, the Post Office and the HCAB.

The government accepted the recommendations in full or in part on 26 October 2023.

=== Phases 5 to 7 ===
On 9 April 2024, the inquiry commenced Phases 5 and 6 to cover "[r]edress, access to justice, Second Sight, Complaint Review and Mediation Scheme, conduct of the group litigation, responding to the scandal, governance, monitoring of Horizon, contractual arrangements, internal and external audit, technical competence, stakeholder engagement, oversight and whistleblowing". Fifteen weeks were scheduled for the hearing of evidence.

The resumed hearings began with a day for the evidence of Alan Bates, who described Post Office officials as "thugs in suits" and contended that the government should have been involved far earlier.

Former MP Lord Arbuthnot, appearing in week one, told the inquiry: "[Post Office management] knew there was a large number of bugs in the system that they hadn't told MPs about. They were operating some sort of behind-the-scenes deception process which suggests to me now that they were stringing MPs along in order to preserve the robustness of Horizon, the existence of Horizon and possibly the existence of the Post Office".

Other witnesses gave evidence in weeks one and two. Alan Cook, former managing director of the Post Office, expressed regret, both for an email in which he wrote that subpostmasters had their "hands in the till" and for not realising sooner that the organisation itself was prosecuting victims of the scandal; he had assumed that the police or the Crown Prosecution Service were responsible for the decision to prosecute. Adam Crozier, former CEO of Royal Mail, said he was not aware of the prosecutions brought by Post Office Ltd against subpostmasters during his tenure. David Miller, former Post Office COO, told the inquiry that he should not have said to the board that Horizon was "robust and fit for purpose". Rodric Williams, a litigation lawyer for the Post Office, said there was a "bunker mentality" among staff in relation to the media's coverage of the Horizon system; asked by a journalist when was the last time the Post Office did research into subpostmasters' satisfaction with it, Williams said: "We don't need to do research ... the vast majority of our agents and other users work with it just fine".

During week three, Susan Crichton, former general counsel of the Post Office, testified that problems in the system came to be referred to as 'branch exceptions' rather than 'bugs' and agreed that this demonstrated the use of 'smoke and mirrors'. Angela van den Bogerd, a former senior manager at the Post Office, was questioned about her statement to the High Court in 2019 in which she said she had only become aware in 2018 that transactions could be input to Horizon without a subpostmaster's knowledge; emails given to the inquiry showed she was told about this in 2010 and 2014. Van den Bogerd told the inquiry that she did not remember receiving the December 2010 email, calling it "very strange".

In week five, Simon Clarke, who advised the Post Office to stop prosecuting branch owner-operators, testified that he was "now sure" that the company "must have deceived" him because it failed to provide him with "highly relevant material" and that his law firm "had been mis-instructed" by the Post Office about whether the IT system could be accessed remotely by Fujitsu staff.

In week six, Alisdair Cameron, Post Office CFO and former interim chief executive, told the inquiry that former CEO Vennells had been "clear in her conviction" that nothing had gone wrong with Horizon and did not believe there had been miscarriages of justice.

Paula Vennells testified over three days during week seven. Before her appearance, she was called on by former subpostmistress and campaigner Jo Hamilton to tell the truth at the inquiry as she was "heading into the corner where there's no way out". When she began testifying, Vennells said that the Post Office's structure and the failure of some employees to pass on information meant that she was unaware that subpostmasters were being required to make good Horizon shortfalls or being wrongly prosecuted. Given evidence that showed that she had been told in 2011 that remote access to Horizon was possible, she said that she had not understood what she had been told. Vennells agreed that "the right and honest thing for the Post Office to have done" would have been to let the CCRC know immediately in 2013 about the doubts over the evidence of Gareth Jenkins, the Fujitsu engineer who designed the Horizon accounting system and who had withheld information from the courts about bugs in the software.

Testifying over two days in week eight, former Post Office chair Alice Perkins said that, while she was warned about potential faults in the Horizon IT system when she took up the role in 2011, at the time she did not make a link between those faults and the prosecution of subpostmasters. She also said that the 2013 Clarke advice, raising concerns over expert witness statements, had not reached her.

During week nine, Andrew Parsons, a partner at Womble Bond Dickinson (a law firm advising the Post Office for more than seven years), testified that in 2013 he had counselled the Post Office to remove apologies from letters sent to subpostmasters and to "maintain a more cold, procedural approach", writing that apologising would be "admitting some degree of culpability". In a 2015 email, he wrote that the Post Office could "start attacking the postmasters' credibility by calling out Thomas, Misra and Hamilton as the liars and criminals that they are".

On 18 June, Ian Henderson and Ron Warmington of the forensic accounting company Second Sight gave evidence. They stated that the Post Office had interfered with their investigation, and seemed to be concerned mostly with self-protection. By February 2015, Henderson said, he felt they "were dealing with a cover-up" by the Post Office "and possibly a criminal conspiracy". They also stated that they had been the subject of legal threats by the Post Office. Also testifying in week 10, Richard Christou, former CEO and executive chairman of Fujitsu Services Holdings, said he had always regarded the rollout of the Horizon IT system as one of Fujitsu's "major successes".

In week eleven, Gareth Jenkins, the former senior Fujitsu engineer who played a leading role in specifying and designing the Horizon system, testified that he had "thought the system was working well" and that he had been "confident, possibly wrongly so, [bugs] were quickly fixed and weren't left to fester in the system and have a large impact". He admitted that, during prosecutions of subpostmasters, he changed crucial expert testimony at the request of the Post Office, in particular to state that "it looked as though [Seema] Misra had stolen money rather than that it was incompetence".

Tim Parker, part-time PO chairman from 2015 to 2022, gave evidence on 3 July. Questioned about the report he commissioned from barrister Jonathan Swift, he said he regretted accepting internal legal advice which meant the full findings of the report were not shown to the PO board, UK Government Investments (UKGI) or the responsible minister.

During weeks thirteen and fourteen, the inquiry heard from leading figures at the Shareholder Executive and its successor UKGI, Mark Russell, Robert Swannell, Patrick O'Sullivan and Stephen Lovegrove. Swannell, a former chair of Marks & Spencer, told the inquiry that the Post Office became UKGI's top priority in 2019, after the "excoriating" judgment in the group litigation. He said he "had heard for the previous years that there was nothing wrong with Horizon" and blamed "a closed, defensive culture that was not in the business of giving information". Former Post Office minister Ed Davey, who was in office between 2010 and 2012, said that during that time he was "lied to" about "serious flaws" in the Horizon IT system.

Appearing before the inquiry in the penultimate week of Phase 6, Vince Cable, business secretary between 2010 and 2015, said he was unaware of the prosecutions, despite being in charge of the organisation while in government, and that he agreed with Alan Bates's description of Post Office middle-management as "thugs in suits".

Phase 7, covering current practice and procedures and recommendations for the future, commenced on 23 September 2024 and lasted six weeks. In the first week of this phase, it was revealed that in May 2024, Fujitsu's Patterson had written directly to Nick Read, chief executive of Post Office Ltd, rejecting a request by Post Office investigators for Horizon IT data to support a criminal case against a sub post office owner. Patterson wrote that the request was "inappropriate" and that the Post Office was "well aware there have been and there continue to be bugs, errors and defects in the Horizon system". Appearing before the inquiry over three days in October, Read said he had not been made aware of the "scale and enormity" of the scandal before taking the CEO job in 2019. He expressed surprise at a survey (commissioned by the inquiry) which indicated that subpostmasters are still using their own money to make losses good, while admitting that new subpostmaster contracts which still refer to the Post Office's investigatory powers might be "heavy-handed".

The inquiry was told in the fourth week that, as recently as 2023, Post Office executives changed data on the Horizon IT systems used by subpostmasters, without their knowledge.

Kemi Badenoch, who had been Secretary of State for Business and Trade from February 2023, told the inquiry in its final week that it was "extremely disappointing" that it took the 2024 ITV drama about the Post Office scandal to get the government to accelerate compensation payments for wrongfully prosecuted subpostmasters.

Testifying again in the final week of the inquiry was Fujitsu's Patterson who contended that the previous seven months of inquiry hearings had revealed that many organisations were to blame for the scandal, not just Fujitsu and its faulty software.

Closing statements were heard on 16 and 17 December 2024, after which the inquiry began Maxwellisation prior to drafting the final report. In his end of year message, Sir Wyn said, " [T]he evidence I have read and heard throughout the Inquiry has made a deep impression upon me and emphasised the scale of the hardship and suffering endured by those affected by the scandal."

=== Final report ===
The 162-page volume one of Sir Wyn's final inquiry report was published on 8 July 2025. The Post Office, Fujitsu, and the government have until 10 October to respond. Sir Wyn found that Post Office managers "maintained the fiction" that Horizon was accurate. In the report, it was revealed that at least 13 suicides had been linked to the scandal and at least 59 further people had had suicidal thoughts, of whom at least ten had attempted suicide.

== Data leak ==
On 19 June 2024, the Post Office accidentally published a document on its corporate website containing the names and addresses of 555 former sub-postmasters who had been involved in litigation against the Post Office.

In a letter written to Post Office's chief executive Nick Read and interim chairperson Nigel Railton, former sub-postmaster Christopher Head wrote that the leak had "caused a great amount of upset, distress and anger amongst those whose data is now within the public domain" and observed that many sub-postmasters whose data had been leaked "hadn't shared details with their own families".

Ron Warmington of the forensic accounting company Second Sight, which had investigated the Horizon system in 2023, stated that the data leak was "another example of Post Office incompetence".

Post Office took the document down from its corporate website and referred itself to the Information Commissioner's Office in respect of the data breach.

== Criminal investigation ==
When handing down the Horizon issues judgment in December 2019, Fraser said he had passed a file to the Director of Public Prosecutions relating to evidence given by Fujitsu employees in actions brought by the Post Office. In January 2020, at the request of the director of public prosecutions, the Metropolitan Police initiated a criminal investigation into potential offences of perjury and perverting the course of justice during the investigations and prosecutions carried out by the Post Office. Two former Fujitsu expert witnesses were interviewed under caution. The Metropolitan Police confirmed in January 2024 that they were investigating possible additional offences of fraud in relation to "monies recovered from sub-postmasters as a result of prosecutions or civil actions".

In May 2024, Stephen Clayman, the Metropolitan Police commander, confirmed that plans had been drawn up to expand the investigation into a national effort, saying, "Given the significant scale of the investigation, it has been agreed by the National Police Chiefs' Council (NPCC) that the next phase of the investigation will be a national policing effort, coordinated by the Met, with the pursuit of justice at its heart." The Guardian reported that 80 detectives had been assigned to the investigation, scheduled to run until 2025, with an estimated budget of more than £6.75m.

== Regulatory action ==
In January 2024, the Solicitors Regulation Authority (SRA) confirmed that it is continuing to investigate "live cases into a number of solicitors and law firms who were working on behalf of the Post Office/Royal Mail Group". The Bar Standards Board (which regulates barristers) is a core participant of the public inquiry, and said in February 2024 that no evidence heard by the inquiry "indicates that any members of the Bar present an ongoing risk to the public that requires the BSB to act immediately".

In June 2024, the SRA stated it was conducting more than 20 investigations into solicitors. As of April 2026, the BSB had ten live investigations into barristers who had advised the Post Office. In June 2026, the Solicitors Regulation Authority referred former Post Office general counsel Jane MacLeod to the Solicitors Disciplinary Tribunal over allegations that she failed to cooperate with the Post Office Horizon IT Inquiry by refusing to give oral evidence in 2024. In October 2026, the tribunal granted MacLeod permission to participate remotely from Australia in disciplinary proceedings scheduled for January 2027. The SRA opposed this decision, arguing that Macleod was "putting her own convenience" first by refusing to attend in person.

A public interest investigation by the computer scientist Junade Ali in January 2024 found that Gareth Jenkins, who gave evidence in court attesting to the accuracy of the Horizon system (and later became a person of interest to the Metropolitan Police), solely relied upon qualifications obtained by the British Computer Society (BCS) to be accepted by the court as an expert, despite the society being obligated by the Engineering Council to uphold the conduct of its members. The BCS later stated they would take action after the public inquiry and legal processes had been completed. In June 2024, Karl Flinders of Computer Weekly reported that the day before he was to give evidence at the public inquiry, Jenkins had resigned his BCS membership and Chartered IT Professional status after he was informed earlier that month that he could face disciplinary action for breaching the society's code of conduct.

The Post Office is also regulated by the Financial Conduct Authority. Research by Tussell has found the FCA was one of numerous governmental organisations that also had a contract with Fujitsu.

== Reactions to the scandal ==
=== Call for reform on digital evidence ===
In May 2021, the British Computer Society, a professional body for those working in IT in the UK, called for reconsideration of courts' default presumption that computer data is correct.

Horizon was not subjected to a full, rigorous system audit. In 2010, senior Post Office management took a decision that Horizon would not be subjected to an independent review because:

If one were commissioned – any investigation would need to be disclosed in court. Although we would be doing the review to comfort others, any perception that POL doubts its own systems would mean that all criminal prosecutions would have to be stayed. It would also beg a question for the Court of Appeal over past prosecutions and imprisonments.

No independent review was conducted until Second Sight was commissioned in 2012; their contract was terminated abruptly before it could formally report. The Post Office have not offered any evidence that their own internal auditors conducted an appropriate system audit.

=== Call for improvements to corporate governance ===
In October 2024, the Institute of Directors published a policy paper "The Post Office Scandal: A failure of governance" in response to phase 6 of the public enquiry. The report states that "Over a period of 20 years, numerous cohorts of directors failed to deliver adequate scrutiny of management and key business activities ... As a result, the board did not sufficiently address the key risks to which the business was exposed". It makes recommendations for improved corporate governance, as well as reform of the law on computer-generated evidence and changes to the role of UKGI.

== Media ==
=== Investigative reporting ===
A Computer Weekly article written by Rebecca Thomson in July 2013 listed more than 300 articles on the scandal published by the magazine, since it first broke the story in May 2009 with seven case studies. This first article was read by a Welsh BBC reporter, and in May 2009 BBC Wales went on to report that "an investigation by a respected technical journal ... appeared to be calling into question the integrity of the Post Office Horizon system". On 8 September 2009, the jailing of Anglesey subpostmaster Noel Thomas was covered on the S4C current affairs programme Taro Naw, making the claims of problems with Horizon, and interviewing Alan Bates, Lee Castleton and Jo Hamilton, who had featured in the Computer Weekly article. The programme also uncovered a further nine subpostmasters who had been affected.

In November 2010, the husband of Surrey subpostmistress Seema Misra, who had been jailed while pregnant, spoke to Nick Wallis, then the presenter of the breakfast programme on BBC Radio Surrey, who after some research and discovering the prior mentions, used his contacts to get the issue reported on 7 February 2011 on both BBC Radio Surrey, and regional BBC One television current affairs programme Inside Out. Wallis also shared his information with Private Eye magazine, which ran many articles on the scandal, starting in September 2011. A former Fujitsu employee saw the BBC South report and decided to blow the whistle to the JFSA, and later to BBC Panorama.

Starting in 2012, other BBC news and current affairs programmes and national newspapers began to cover the scandal, with the Daily Mail in 2015 publishing a double-page spread entitled "Decent lives destroyed by the Post Office".

From 2018, Wallis, following on from his work on Panorama and in Private Eye, and having left the BBC, started reporting the trial on a specially-set up journalism blog, postofficetrial.com, having raised £9,000 through crowd-funding.

In 2020, Private Eye published online a special report co-authored by Richard Brooks and Wallis titled "Justice Lost In The Post". A BBC Radio 4 series about the scandal, The Great Post Office Trial, presented by Wallis and produced by Whistledown Productions, was named "Best News and Factual Radio Programme" in 2020 by the Voice of the Listener & Viewer, and won two gold awards in the 2021 New York Festivals Radio Awards. In November 2021 Wallis' book, The Great Post Office Scandal was published by Bath Publishing.

=== Dramatisation ===
A four-part television drama, Mr Bates vs the Post Office, starring Toby Jones as Alan Bates, was broadcast over four evenings on ITV from 1 January 2024. The drama brought the scandal to the centre of public and political attention. During the period of broadcast, an additional fifty victims contacted lawyers, five of whom seek to get criminal convictions quashed. As of 9 January, it was reported that more than a hundred further potential victims had contacted lawyers following the broadcast. The drama was followed by a documentary, Mr Bates vs The Post Office: The Real Story, which included interviews with subpostmasters.

Following the broadcast, a petition to strip Vennells of her CBE passed one million signatures. On 9 January 2024, she announced that she would hand back her CBE. However, this would have no formal effect as only the monarch, on the advice of the Honours Forfeiture Committee, can revoke honours. On 23 February 2024, King Charles III revoked Vennells' CBE.

In January 2026, British Scandal, a podcast published by Wondery, covered the event in four episodes. Alice Levine and Matt Forde interviewed barrister Paul Marshall for the final episode.

== See also ==
- Dutch childcare benefits scandal
- Orange S.A. suicides
- Phoenix pay system
- Princess of Wales Hospital
- Robodebt scheme

== Bibliography ==
- Wallis, Nick (2021a). The Great Post Office Scandal (updated 1st ed.). Bath Publishing. ISBN 978-1-9163023-8-9.
