= Seema Misra =

British campaigner and former subpostmaster

Seema Misra OBE
- Born: 1975 (age 50–51); India
- Occupation: Former subpostmaster
- Known for: Campaigner for justice for victims of the British Post Office scandal

Seema Misra OBE is a former subpostmaster and a campaigner for justice for victims of the British Post Office scandal. She ran the post office in the village of West Byfleet in Surrey from 2005 until 2008, when she was suspended and then wrongly prosecuted for shortfalls caused by the Post Office faulty accounting software, Horizon. In 2010, after being convicted of theft and false accounting, she was sent to prison when she was eight weeks pregnant. She was one of the 555 litigants in the successful group legal action of Bates & Others v Post Office Ltd. Her criminal conviction was overturned in April 2021. She was appointed Officer of the Order of the British Empire (OBE) in the 2024 New Year Honours for services to justice.

== Subpostmaster at West Byfleet ==
Misra and her husband Davinder grew up in New Delhi in India and moved to England in 1999. After various jobs, the couple opened a village shop in Caddington, Bedfordshire. In 2005 they bought the village shop and post office in West Byfleet. Misra went on a two-week training course. From the moment she started working in the post office on 30 June 2005, even when a trainer was supervising her during the first week, there were problems balancing with Horizon and Misra was told to put money from the shop into the post office till.

The balancing discrepancies increased and, in October 2005, a Post Office auditor visited the premises and told Misra to make good a shortfall of £3,000. At that stage Misra and her husband began suspecting staff of dishonesty. Misra made frequent calls to her area manager and to the Horizon helpline but the situation did not improve. Misra started to agree inaccurate Horizon balances and borrowed money from her sister-in-law to make good the mounting shortfalls. On 14 January 2008, auditors from the Post Office found a discrepancy of £79,000 and Misra was suspended. On 27 November 2008, she was charged with theft and false accounting.

== Trial and imprisonment ==
Misra's trial was set for 1 June 2009. She decided to plead guilty to false accounting but denied the charge of theft of £74,000. The Post Office pursued the theft charge in the hope of being able to obtain a proceeds of crime order, even though there was no evidence of the missing money in Misra's home or bank accounts. The day before her trail, Misra was searching the internet for help when she came across the story of subpostmaster Jo Hamilton who had been convicted of false accounting even though she had not stolen any money. Misra contacted Hamilton and was told about the Computer Weekly article, published three weeks earlier, that had broken the story about problems with Horizon. Misra's barrister was able to successfully apply for an adjournment of the trial, as Misra, who had put the shortfalls down to theft by staff, now had a new defence of computer error.

Misra's defence team engaged Professor Charles McLachlan as an expert witness, but he had difficulty obtaining disclosure of Horizon data from the Post Office. Misra went on trial before Judge Neil Stewart and a jury at Guildford Crown Court on 11 October 2010. Amongst her supporters in court were her husband and other subpostmasters including Hamilton. On 21 October 2010 she was found guilty of the theft of £74,609.84. On 11 November 2010, her son's tenth birthday, Misra was sentenced to 15 months' in prison for the theft, and six months concurrently for each of six false accounting charges to which she had pleaded guilty. She was eight weeks pregnant with her second child. She was released after four-and-a-half months in Bronzefield prison and gave birth in hospital wearing an electronic tag. She was also ordered to pay the Post Office £40,000 under a proceeds of crime order.

== Campaigning for justice ==
Misra joined the Justice for Subpostmasters Alliance (JFSA) group that had been set up by Alan Bates in 2009. Her story was featured on a Panorama programme on the Post Office scandal, broadcast on 17 August 2017. Misra was one of the 555 subpostmasters who joined the group legal action of Bates & Others v Post Office Ltd, heard by Justice Fraser in the High Court at the Rolls Building in London between 2017 and 2019. After two subtrials, one of which looked at the subpostmasters' contracts and found largely in their favour and the other which found that Horizon contained bugs, errors and defects that could lead to accounting discrepancies, the claimants had run out of funding and agreed a settlement of £56.75 million with the Post Office. Legal costs of £46 million were deducted, leaving the 555 claimants with less than £12 million to be divided between them. The settlement agreement stated that "the Defendant has not made, or agreed to make, any payment to or for the benefit of any Convicted Claimant". Misra, and the minority of claimants who likewise had convictions, therefore received only a small payment thanks to the generosity of their fellow claimants. The case, however, would open the way for those convicted to pursue the Post Office for malicious prosecution and gain larger sums of compensation.

On 26 March 2020, following the judgment in Bates & Others v Post Office Ltd, the Criminal Cases Review Commission referred Misra's case, along with those of 38 other convicted subpostmasters, to the Court of Appeal. Misra featured in a second Panorama programme on the Post Office scandal, broadcast on 8 June 2020. The programme revealed that the Post Office legal department were told about Horizon errors shortly before her trial, but failed to disclose the material to Misra's defence team.

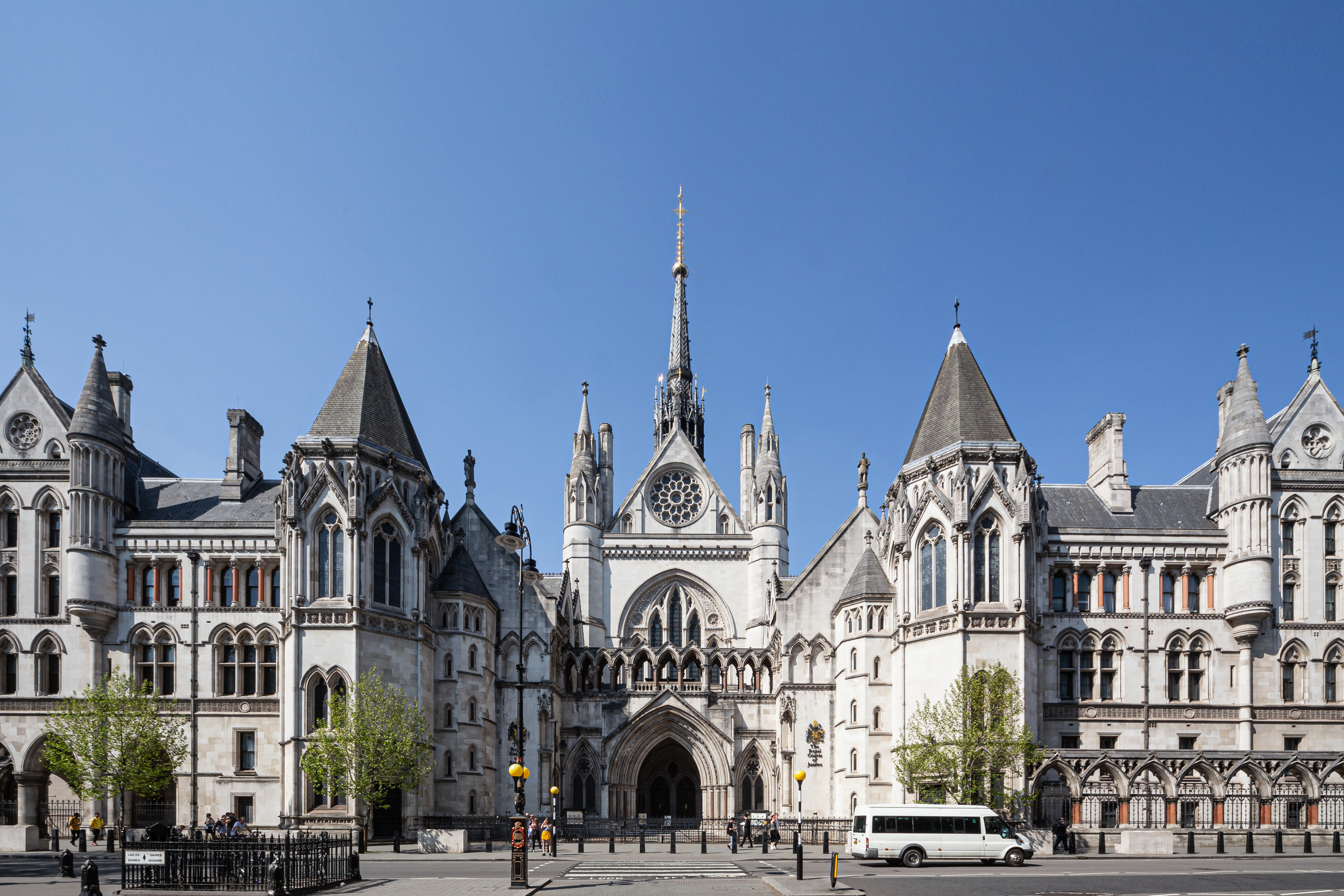
The appeal was heard at the Royal Courts of Justice

By the time the appeal, Hamilton & Others v Post Office Limited, came to court in March 2021 there was a total of 42 appellants. Misra and two other appellants were represented by barristers Paul Marshall and Flora Page. On 23 April 2021, Misra and 38 other subpostmasters officially had their convictions quashed and their names cleared as the judgment was handed down at the Royal Courts of Justice. The Court of Appeal also decided that their prosecutions had been an affront to justice. Lord Justice Holroyde said that the Post Office had "consistently asserted that Horizon was robust and reliable", even though they were aware that it was not reliable, and "effectively steamrolled over any sub-postmaster who sought to challenge its accuracy".

== Horizon IT Inquiry ==
An independent review into the Horizon scandal, chaired by retired High Court judge Sir Wyn Williams, was set up in September 2020 and converted into a statutory public inquiry the following year. Misra gave testimony to the inquiry on 25 February 2022 during the human impact hearings. She regularly attended the inquiry. In November 2023, she was present when Warwick Tatford, the barrister who acted for the Post Office in her trial, gave evidence. He apologised for the part he played in her wrongful conviction and admitted that a lot of mistakes had been made in her case. Misra said she accepted his apology, adding: "He's the first person, and only person from the Post Office side, to apologise directly to me". On 11 April 2024, Post Office director David Smith apologised for an email to colleagues in which he had proclaimed her conviction to be "brilliant news". She rejected his apology, saying that he needed to apologise to her sons.

== Awards ==
Misra was appointed an Officer of the Order of the British Empire (OBE) in the 2025 New Year Honours for services to justice. She said that one of the main reasons she accepted the honour was to remind people that the scandal wasn't yet over, and that her aim was "to be able to show this is still happening and to get proper, full and fair compensation for everybody, and most importantly, accountability".

Her portrait was painted by Jack Dickson for a 2026 episode of the BBC Television series Extraordinary Portraits.
