= Lee Castleton =

British former Subpostmaster (born 1969)

Lee Castleton OBE
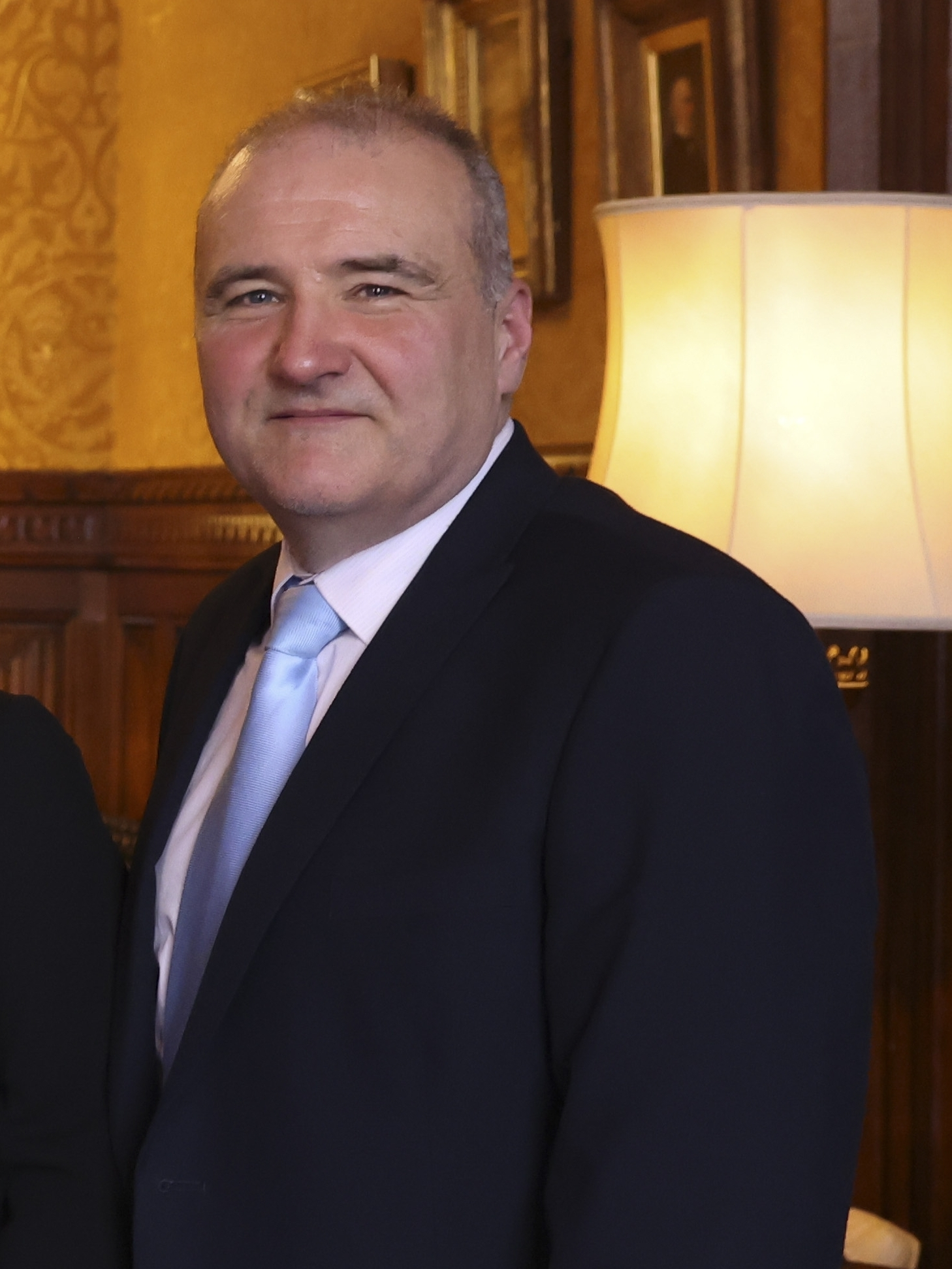
- Castleton in 2024
- Born: January 1, 1969 (age 57)
- Occupations: Former subpostmaster; electrician
- Known for: Campaigner for justice for victims of the British Post Office scandal
- Spouse: Lisa Castleton
- Children: 2

Lee Castleton OBE (born 1 January 1969) is an English former subpostmaster who was sued by the Post Office and bankrupted after his accounts showed discrepancies due to the Post Office's faulty Horizon accounting software. He has since become a prominent campaigner for other victims of the British Post Office scandal.

== Biography ==
Castleton trained as an electrician and spent nine years in the RAF. After managing a shop and a brief stint as a stockbroker, in July 2003 he and his wife bought a post office and newsagent's with attached residential property in Bridlington, Yorkshire. Castleton, who was aged 35 with two young children at the time, became the subpostmaster, while his wife Lisa ran the retail side of the business. At first all went well, but in January 2004 the faulty Post Office Horizon accounting system, which was developed by Fujitsu, started showing discrepancies. Castleton phoned the Horizon helpline 91 times, only to be given bland assurances that things would right themselves or, eventually, be told that he was responsible for the shortfalls. By March 2004 the false shortfalls had reached about £23,000; Castleton was suspended and then had his contract terminated.

When Castleton refused to give the Post Office £25,000, the Post Office raised a civil claim against him at Scarborough County Court. Castleton's solicitor advised him to counter-claim for defamation and loss of income. When the case came to court on 9 February 2006, the Post Office's legal team did not turn up so the judge dismissed their claim and awarded Castleton his counter-claim. The Post Office then raised the case again, this time in the High Court in London. Castleton's legal insurance had run out and he had to represent himself; the Post Office spared no expense even though they knew they could not recover their legal costs if they won, as Castleton had no assets. The case was heard before Justice Richard Havery in December 2006 and January 2007. The judge found in favour of the Post Office and awarded £321,000 costs against Castleton. Unable to pay the costs, Castleton was forced to declare bankruptcy. The case and bankruptcy had a devastating impact on the lives of Castleton and his family. He was forced to close his shop and return to his former occupation of electrician. He had to sell his home and move into rented accommodation. His wife suffered stress-induced seizures and his children had to move schools because of bullying.

The Post Office later admitted, during the Post Office Horizon IT Inquiry, that they had brought the case to make an example of Castleton, to defend the Horizon software and to deter other subpostmasters from bringing legal claims against them. During the inquiry former Post Office CEO Paula Vennells agreed that locking Castleton out of the mediation scheme that had been set up in 2013 was "unforgivable". In a media interview, Castleton said "I just wish she would have recognised that in 2013 - it would have made such a difference to a lot of people". Giving evidence to the inquiry, Fujitsu employee Peter Sewell, who had never had any contact with Castleton, apologised for having referred to him as a "nasty chap" in an internal email during the court case. Castleton told media: "Obviously it's difficult to hear but it's not something that I didn't expect... I think we're all realists and we knew there was some kind of conspiracy under there and it's been laid out for all to see."

Castleton was one of seven subpostmasters to be included in the Computer Weekly investigation in 2009, which broke the story to the public. He was also one of the 555 subpostmaster involved in the Bates & Others v Post Office Ltd court cast alongside Sir Alan Bates and Jo Hamilton.

Castleton's story was featured in the ITV drama Mr Bates vs The Post Office, which dramatized the scandal up until the conclusion of the Bates & Others v Post Office Ltd court case in 2019. He was played by Will Mellor, whom he has since become friends with. He is featured in the BBC documentary, Surviving the Post Office, (hosted by Mellor) which gives an update on the lives of some of subpostmasters and their families who were affected by the scandal.

Castleton was awarded an Order of the British Empire (OBE) in the 2025 New Years Honours for service to justice. In March 2025, Castleton initiated legal proceedings against the Post Office and Fujitsu.
