= Nick Read (Post Office CEO) =

Former CEO of Post Office Ltd.

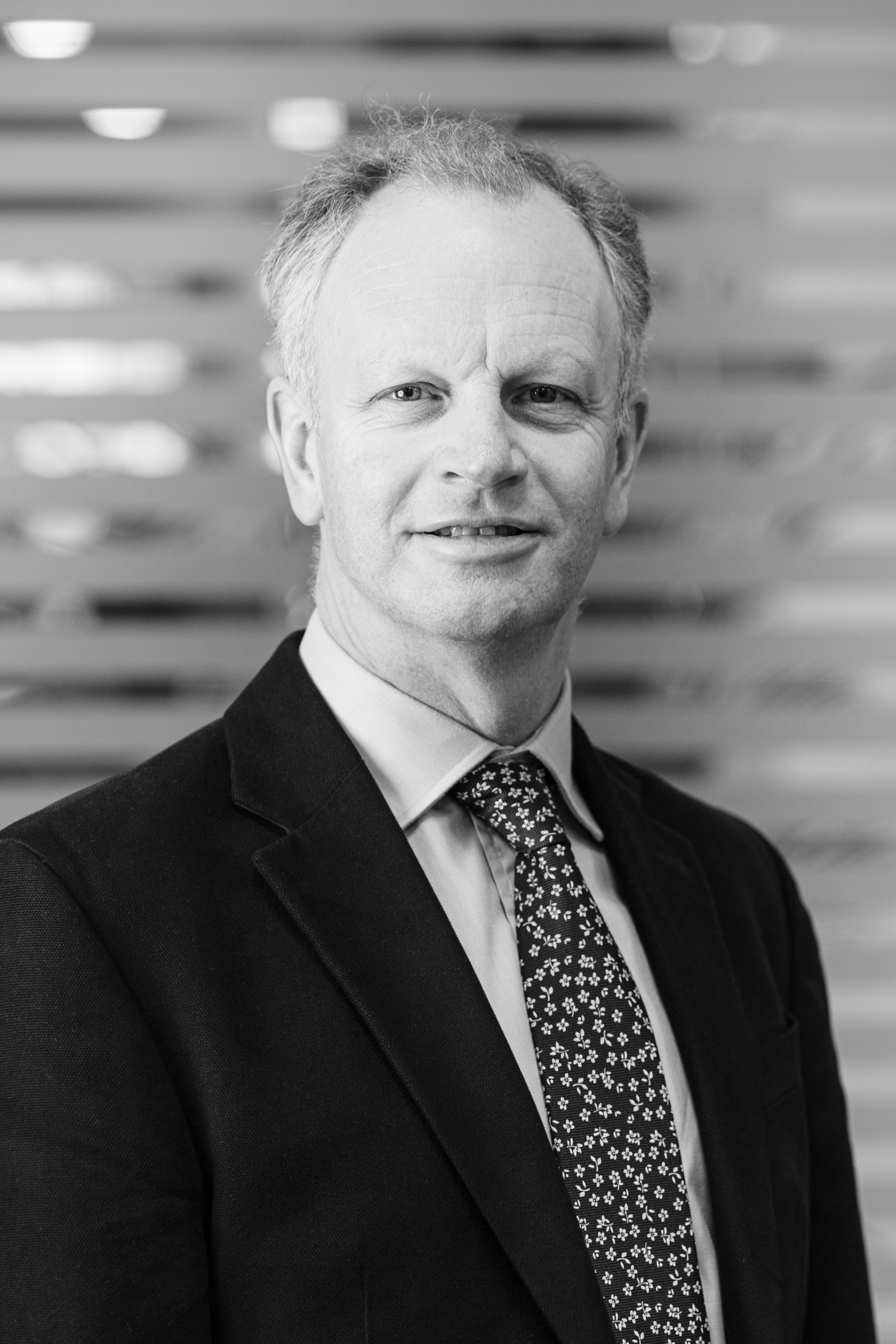
- Read in 2020

Chief Executive Officer of Post Office Limited
- In office September 2019 – April 2025
- Preceded by: Paula Vennells
- Succeeded by: Neil Brocklehurst (Acting)

Personal details
- Born: Nicholas James Read; March 1966 (age 60)
- Education: Ampleforth College
- Profession: business executive

Nicholas James Read (born March 1966) is a British business executive who was CEO of Post Office Limited from 2019 to 2025. Previously he held senior positions in several customer-facing businesses, and was CEO of Nisa from 2015 to 2017.

== Early life ==
Read was born in March 1966 in Hanover, Germany, the son of a soldier. He was educated at Ampleforth College, then an all-boys independent Catholic school, and the Royal Military Academy Sandhurst.

In August 1986, Read was commissioned in the British Army as a second lieutenant in the 4th/7th Royal Dragoon Guards. He was promoted to lieutenant on 9 August 1988. He left the regular army in August 1989 and was transferred to the Territorial Army, where he gained the rank of captain in October 1993. In 1991–1992 he completed a bachelor's degree in Business Studies at the University of Buckingham.

== Business career ==
After leaving the Army in 1993, Read worked for Aldi UK and Deloitte Consulting, and held senior positions at Tesco, Vodafone, HBOS, Lloyds Banking Group, Vodafone, and then Thomas Cook, where he was group customer service director. He received an MBA from Cranfield in 1998.

In February 2015, he was appointed as CEO of the shopkeeper-owned Nisa convenience store group, where he led what was described as a "hard-fought turnaround". He was then involved in the sale of the business to the Co-op group, agreed in November 2017 and completed the next year. From April 2018 he was CEO of ExtraEnergie GmbH, whose British subsidiary Extra Energy ceased trading in November of that year, around the same time as a number of other small energy suppliers collapsed.

In September 2019, Read took up the role of CEO at Post Office Limited after Paula Vennells stepped down. His appointment came at a time when the Post Office was ceasing to receive government subsidy, and when long-running litigation came to a head concerning actions (including prosecutions) taken by the Post Office against self-employed subpostmasters, based on flawed evidence from the Horizon IT system. During 2019, a series of judgments was issued in a group litigation against the Post Office by 555 subpostmasters, in which the Post Office agreed to pay £58 million and incurred £43 million in legal costs. Alan Bates, one of the lead claimants, praised Read for his efforts "to reset the relationship between the Post Office and its sub-postmasters".

In August 2023, Read apologised for "mistakes" made by the Post Office when it linked executives' bonus payments to their work related to the public inquiry into the miscarriage of justice. He said he would voluntarily return an amount (reported to be £54,400) from the £455,000 bonus he received for the 2021–22 financial year. In January 2024, he gave evidence to Parliament's Business and Trade Committee, which led to a dispute over details of his oral replies.

In July 2024, Read decided to step back from his CEO role in order to prepare for the next phase of the public inquiry into the Horizon IT scandal, which would examine current practices at the Post Office. In September 2024 he resigned from his CEO role, to take effect in March 2025.

== Personal life ==
He is married to Clare and they have three sons. In 2020 he lived near Andover, Hampshire.
