= Tim Parker (businessman) =

British executive (born 1955)

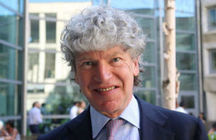
- Born: 19 June 1955 (age 71)

Timothy Charles Parker (born 19 June 1955) is a British executive. He has been chairman of the National Trust, Post Office Ltd and Her Majesty's Courts and Tribunals Service (HMCTS). From 1986 to 2014 he was CEO of a number of companies, including successively Kenwood, Clarks Shoes, Kwik-Fit, the AA and Samsonite. He is currently non-executive chairman of Samsonite, and a director of British Pathe.

== Early life and education ==
Parker was born in Aldershot, Hampshire, in 1955. The son of an army officer, he spent much of his childhood abroad. He was educated at Abingdon School in Abingdon, Oxfordshire, leaving in 1973.

He attended Pembroke College, Oxford, where he was chairman of the Oxford University Labour Club. He has an MA in philosophy, politics and economics from Oxford (1977), and an MSc in business studies from the London Business School (1981).

== Career ==
After graduating from Oxford, Parker worked as a junior economist in HM Treasury from 1977 to 1979. In 1981, after obtaining his business degree, he joined Thorn EMI as assistant to Sir William Barlow, chairman of the engineering group.

At the age of 26, he was appointed CEO of Blakeslee, a small engineering subsidiary of Thorn EMI in Chicago. After two years he had the business sold off as lacking in scalability. Returning to the UK, he headed Crypto Peerless, a Birmingham company manufacturing foodservice equipment, which in a little over two years he took from break-even to £800,000 in profits.

In 1986, he was appointed CEO of the appliance manufacturer Kenwood. In 1989 he led a management-based leveraged buyout of the business, with backing from the private-equity firm Candover Investments; the company was purchased for £52 million. It was listed on London Stock Exchange in 1992 at a valuation of £104 million.

In 1996, Parker became CEO of Clarks Shoes. He substantially reorganised the company, closed 20 factories, moved manufacturing overseas, and revived the Clarks brand with more up-to-date shoe styles. Within six years, the company's profitability increased by 150%, and by the time he left, in 2002, it had revenues approaching £1 billion a year.

In August 2002, he was hired as CEO of Kwik-Fit, after CVC Capital Partners acquired the company from Ford. He undertook a major restructuring of the business, including cutting 3,000 jobs. During his tenure as CEO, profits increased by 250%. The business was sold to PAI Partners in 2005 for £800 million, with Parker earning £20 million from the deal.

In 2004, CVC Capital Partners and Permira purchased the AA from Centrica for £1.75 billion, and Parker was appointed CEO. During the next two years, he carried out a fundamental restructuring programme and one-third of the company's 10,000 jobs were cut in the process. Parker was subsequently dubbed the "Prince of Darkness" by trade unions. The AA's EBITDA increased from £120 million in 2004 to £305 million in 2007. In 2007, the AA merged with Saga at an enterprise value of £3.35 billion.

From 7 July to 19 August 2008, Parker was the first deputy mayor of London, under Boris Johnson. He was also chairman of Transport for London and CEO of the Greater London Authority during that period, before resigning.

In November 2008, he was appointed non-executive chairman of Samsonite, and was made CEO in January 2009. CVC Capital Partners acquired Samsonite in July 2007. The 2008 financial crisis affected the luggage company due to the declines in international air travel and consumer spending; 2008 earnings before interest, tax, depreciation, and amortisation collapsed from $120 million to $40 million. Parker was brought in to turn the company around. He restructured the company, replaced its management, cut jobs, closed stores, and invested funds in new suitcase designs and marketing. In 2010, earnings before interest, tax, depreciation, and amortisation revived to $192 million. The company was listed on the Hong Kong Stock Exchange in June 2011, raising $1.25 billion in the IPO. Following his appointment to the National Trust, in August 2014 Parker resigned as CEO of Samsonite, effective 1 October 2014; he stayed on as non-executive chairman of the company.

In 2009, he was the lead investor in the private-equity acquisition of British Pathé, and the historic film archive launched a newly established and dedicated London office, and a new website. He remains a director and owner of the British Pathé film archive.

In 2014, he was appointed chairman of the National Trust, an unpaid role which he held until 2022.

Parker became chairman of Post Office Ltd in October 2015, at first working one-and-a-half days a week, reducing to two days a month in November 2017. His appointment came in the midst of a long dispute between the Post Office and a number of subpostmasters over problems with its Horizon computer system. In June 2016, he told subpostmasters that replacing Horizon would "incur considerable risk". The faulty Horizon system was responsible for hundreds of subpostmasters being accused of accounting fraud and theft since its installation in 1999, and hundreds of wrongful convictions. In December 2019, the Post Office agreed to a £58 million settlement, and a High Court judge ruled that bugs, errors, and defects in the Horizon system caused shortfalls in branch accounts. In October 2020, after the Post Office conceded appeals by 44 former subpostmasters to overturn convictions linked to the Horizon scandal, Parker issued an apology, stating "I am sincerely sorry on behalf of the Post Office for historical failings which seriously affected some postmasters. Post Office is resetting its relationship with postmasters with reforms that prevent such past events ever happening again. Post Office wishes to ensure that all postmasters entitled to claim civil compensation because of their convictions being overturned are recompensed as quickly as possible. Therefore, we are considering the best process for doing that". The prosecution by Post Office Ltd of 732 subpostmasters in relation to the faulty Horizon system has been described as the biggest miscarriage of justice in British history. He resigned as chairman of Post Office Ltd on 30 September 2022. Parker gave evidence to the public enquiry into the scandal in July 2024.

In April 2018, Parker was appointed chairman of Her Majesty's Courts and Tribunals Service (HMCTS), effective 27 April 2018. He left HMCTS in December 2022.

== Additional board memberships ==
As of 2020, in addition to being chairman of Samsonite, Parker is an advisor to CVC Capital Partners.

He is also a trustee of the Royal Academy of Music.

== Personal life ==
Parker is married and has four children.
