= Maxwellisation =

English and Scots civil law practice

Maxwellisation is the legal practice in English and Scots law that allows anyone who is criticised in an official report to respond prior to publication, based on details of the criticism received in advance.

The process takes its name from the publisher Robert Maxwell. In 1969, Maxwell was criticised in a report by the Department of Trade and Industry (DTI) as "unfit to hold the stewardship of a public company". Maxwell took the matter to court, where the DTI was said by the judge to have "virtually committed the business murder" of Maxwell. To avoid any repeat following the ruling, official policy was altered to ensure that prior notice would be given of critical findings. Relevant witnesses are shown the specific extracts of reports relating to them.
