= Alan Bates (subpostmaster) =

British campaigner and former subpostmaster

Sir Alan Bates
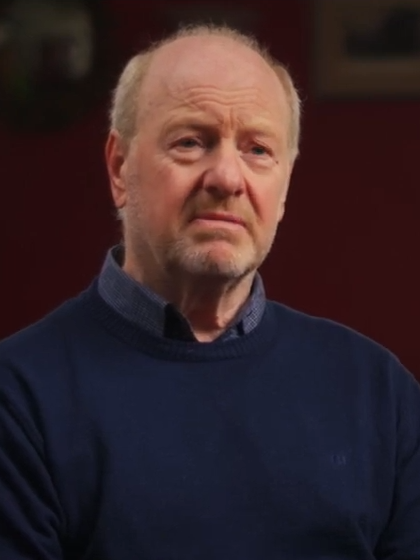
- Bates in 2024
- Born: 1954 (age 71–72); Liverpool, England
- Occupation: Subpostmaster
- Known for: Founder of the Justice for Subpostmasters Alliance (JFSA) and campaigner for victims of the British Post Office scandal
- Spouse: Suzanne Sercombe (m. 2024)

Sir Alan Bates (born 1954) is a former subpostmaster and a leading campaigner for victims of the British Post Office scandal, in which thousands of subpostmasters were accused of dishonesty when faulty Post Office accounting software created shortfalls in their accounts. After the Post Office terminated his contract in 2003 over a false shortfall, he sought out other subpostmasters in the same position and went on to found the Justice For Subpostmasters Alliance in 2009. The group took the Post Office to court and, following two favourable judgments in Bates & Others v Post Office Ltd, accepted a settlement of £57.75 million, which left the 555 claimants with little money after legal fees were paid. Bates has continued to campaign for fair compensation for subpostmasters. He was knighted in June 2024 for his campaigning and the following month received an honorary degree from Bangor University.

== Early life and education ==
Alan Bates was born in 1954 in Liverpool. He studied graphic design in Wrexham.

== Career ==
As a project manager in the heritage sector, he worked on the installation of electronic point of sale systems for castles in Wales and for the Eureka! museum in Halifax.

In the late 1990s, Bates and his partner Suzanne Sercombe, a special needs teacher, decided on a career-change and began looking for a Post Office branch to run. In May 1998, they took over The Wool Post, a post office and haberdashery shop in Craig-y-Don in Llandudno, Wales, investing £65,000 in the post office side of the business. Bates was appointed subpostmaster after undergoing security checks and producing a business plan.

== Post Office scandal ==
In the early 2000s, the Post Office rolled out Horizon, new accounting and point-of-sale software developed and maintained by Fujitsu, to all its branches and sub-post offices. It arrived at Craig-y-Don in October 2000 and problems emerged almost immediately. By December 2000 the system was showing an unexplained £6,000 shortfall, which was eventually reduced to about £1,000. Bates complained repeatedly to Post Office management that the Horizon system was unreliable, that its reporting facilities did not allow tracing of events behind shortfalls, and that it was wrong that operators were obliged to make good on shortfalls caused by the software. Over a two-year period he and his staff made 507 calls to the Post Office helpline, 85 of which related to Horizon. His contract was terminated with no reason given in November 2003. Although he was not prosecuted, he lost the £65,000 which he had invested in the business. In April 2024, when giving evidence at the Horizon IT public inquiry, Bates was shown internal Post Office documents in which his termination was said to be due to him being "unmanageable" and which referred to him as someone who "struggled with accounting".

Bates told Radio New Zealand that he and his partner Suzanne were luckier than many of the other subpostmasters:

Even though the post office was taken away, we still had the retail side of our business, which we ran for a few years… We were fortunate enough to come out with enough to buy outright a small property for ourselves… We both had basic jobs and also I went back to college to [study] more on computer sciences and stuff of that sort, which was very useful going forward. It did help once we started to get into court and on the technical aspects of all of this.

=== Justice for Subpostmasters Alliance ===
After his contract was terminated by the Post Office, Bates sought to highlight his concerns. A letter to his local newspaper was published in October 2003 and led to an article in which he was quoted as saying that he would fight for as long as it takes to right the wrong done to himself and the people of Craig-y-Don. He set up a website called Post Office Victims, inviting subpostmasters who had had similar experiences to come forward. In May 2009, Computer Weekly broke the story of the Post Office scandal, featuring the cases of Alan Bates and six other subpostmasters. The story was taken up by BBC Wales's current affairs programme Taro Naw, which included an interview with Bates and was broadcast in September 2009. Bates then decided it was time to organise a meeting with other subpostmasters who had experienced similar difficulties with Horizon. He chose the village hall in the Warwickshire village of Fenny Compton as the venue of the November 2009 meeting, picking a place in the middle of England at random. About 20 to 25 former subpostmasters attended, many bringing partners, and discussed ways to seek redress from the Post Office. The group decided on the name Justice for Subpostmasters Alliance (JFSA).

With the support of a group of members of Parliament led by James Arbuthnot, whose constituent Jo Hamilton had been convicted of false accounting, the JFSA was responsible for the Post Office's decision in 2013 to appoint independent forensic accountants Second Sight to investigate Horizon prosecutions and establish a mediation scheme. With Second Sight sacked after they became critical of the Post Office's actions, and the mediation scheme closed down, Bates developed plans to take legal action against the Post Office.

=== Bates & Others v Post Office Ltd ===
Represented by solicitor James Hartley from the Yorkshire firm Freeths and a team of barristers under Patrick Green of Henderson Chambers, subpostmasters obtained funding for their case against the Post Office from litigation funders Therium. Bates and forensic accountant Kay Linnell formed a steering group to lead 555 claimants in the case Bates & Others v Post Office Ltd, which was heard under a group litigation order (GLO). Judge Peter Fraser issued his first judgment in March 2019, finding that the Post Office contract was unfair on subpostmasters. The judge survived an attempt by the Post Office to have him recused, but by the time he issued a draft judgment on Horizon issues, which found that the systems contained bugs, errors and defects, the litigants had run out of funding and accepted a settlement of £57.75 million from the Post Office. After legal costs were deducted, the settlement left only about £12 million for the claimants, which was not enough to provide realistic compensation to many of them. The government later announced that it would provide further compensation to the litigants through the GLO compensation scheme. Following the settlement, Bates crowdfunded £98,000 to obtain legal advice to submit a claim to the Parliamentary Ombudsman, asking the government to reimburse the legal costs of the group litigants and provide additional compensation. The Horizon judgment paved the way for convicted subpostmasters to have their convictions quashed.

=== Inquiry ===
In September 2020, the government set up an independent inquiry, chaired by retired High Court judge Sir Wyn Williams, into the Horizon scandal. Bates and the JFSA refused to co-operate until the inquiry was converted into a statutory public inquiry the following year. Bates gave evidence at the inquiry for the first time on 9 April 2024. He told the inquiry that his 20-year campaign had been inspired by a sense of injustice aligned to his own stubbornness:

Once I'd started my individual little campaign, we found others along the way, and eventually we all joined up. It has required dedication, but secondly, it is a cause. I mean, as you got to meet people, and realise it wasn't just yourself. And you saw the harm, the injustice that had been descended upon them, it was something that you felt you had to deal with.

He referred to Post Office officials as "thugs in suits" and said the government had been vindictive in offering him a derisory sum in compensation.

=== Compensation ===
In January 2024, Bates was offered compensation by the Post Office. The sum was about one sixth of what he had claimed and he called the offer cruel and derisory. In May 2024, he rejected a second offer of about double the first.

== Dramatisation ==
Bates was played by Toby Jones in Mr Bates vs The Post Office, a four-part dramatisation of the British Post Office scandal broadcast by ITV in the first week of 2024. By April 2024 the series had been watched by 13.5 million people and reignited public interest in the scandal.

== Honours and awards ==
In early 2024, Bates said that he had declined appointment as Officer of the Order of the British Empire (OBE) because Paula Vennells, a former CEO of Post Office Limited, was still a member of the order. (Note: Vennells was appointed Commander of the Order of the British Empire (CBE) in 2018 for services to the Post Office and to charity. She was stripped of the award in February 2024 for "bringing the honours system into disrepute".) Bates was appointed Knight Bachelor in the 2024 Birthday Honours for services to justice, accepting the honour on behalf of the subpostmasters to whom "horrendous things" had happened.

Bates was recognised for his campaigning in the 2023 Pride of Britain Awards. He received a First Minister's Special Award from the then Welsh first minister Vaughan Gething at the 2024 St David Awards. In July 2024, Bates and fellow Post Office campaigner Noel Thomas were awarded honorary degrees by Bangor University, and the following year Bates received another from the University of Exeter.

== Personal life ==
Bates met his wife, Suzanne Sercombe, in 1990 at an Appalachian clog-dancing event in Exeter. They live in a village outside Old Colwyn on the coast of North Wales. Bates and Sercombe married on 26 August 2024 on Tortola in the British Virgin Islands, followed by a ceremony officiated by Richard Branson on Necker Island the following day. Branson had invited the couple to his island after Bates said in an interview: "If Richard Branson is reading this, I'd love a holiday."
