= Written ministerial statement =

A written ministerial statement is, in the Parliament of the United Kingdom, a statement by a Minister that puts the day-to-day business of government in the public domain. Written statements can be accessed by the public in Hansard.
