= Group litigation order =

A group litigation order (or GLO) is an order of a court in England and Wales, which permits a number of claims which give rise to common or related issues (of fact or law) to be managed collectively.

== History ==
Prior to the introduction of the Civil Procedure Rules the courts of England and Wales had used a number of techniques to manage multiple claims. In particular representative claims permitted a plaintiff (now claimant) who shared the same interest in a claim as a group to either begin or continue a claim as a representative of that group. The court could also consolidate one or more claims so that they were managed or heard together.

The final Access to Justice Report, published in July 1996, concluded that these methods were not sufficiently flexible and recommended that a system for group litigation be introduced.

Group litigation orders were added to the Civil Procedure Rules from 2 May 2000.

== Procedure ==
Any party to a claim may apply for a group litigation order to be made before or after issue of the claim. A single court will be assigned to manage the GLO. A Group Register will then be set up listing all claims which have become part of the GLO. Any party to a case may apply to be added or removed from the group register.

All claims that from part of a GLO will be automatically allocated to the multi-track and will be moved to the management court. There is great flexibility in how group litigation may be managed and directions should be tailored to the specific needs of a particular set of claims.

As a class action, a claimant must explicitly "opt-in" to most claims. In 2015 an "opt-out" basis was established for violations of the Competition Act 1998 and Consumer Rights Act 2015.

== Marketing and regulation of claimant recruitment ==
Group litigation depends on recruiting large numbers of claimants, and the advertising used to do so—commonly featuring phrases such as "no win, no fee" and "no upfront cost"—has attracted regulatory scrutiny in the United Kingdom. In September 2025 the Advertising Standards Authority (ASA) upheld complaints against several group-action promoters. It found that ads by Johnson Law Group for diesel-emissions claims omitted material information and failed to substantiate a claim that drivers could receive up to £10,000 in compensation. The ASA issued parallel rulings against Jones Whyte Law and against KP Law and its associated lead generator "Join the Claim," citing undisclosed success fees, unclear cost exposure, and insufficiently prominent disclosure of lead-generation activity.

In January 2026 the Solicitors Regulation Authority (SRA) issued a formal warning notice on "no win, no fee" arrangements, stating that marketing materials must not exaggerate the benefits or downplay the potential costs and risks, and describing the high-volume consumer-claims market as an enforcement priority. The warning followed the 2024 collapse of SSB Law, in which clients who had signed conditional fee agreements and after-the-event insurance found the insurer declining to cover losing costs, leaving defendants to pursue them for five-figure bills.

== Examples ==
Notable cases in which such an order has been issued include

- the McDonald's hot drinks litigation in the High Court of Justice Queen's Bench Division,
- proceedings against the Royal Liverpool Children's Hospital over the removal of organs,
- the case brought by subpostmasters against the Post Office in the British Post Office scandal.
- Motto & Others v Trafigura Ltd (2009), a claim by around 30,000 residents of Abidjan, Ivory Coast, over illness allegedly caused by the dumping of toxic waste unloaded from the tanker Probo Koala. The group litigation settled for £30 million without admission of liability, and the subsequent detailed assessment of the claimants' £105 million costs bill produced a leading Court of Appeal ruling on GLO costs recovery.
- The VW NOx Emissions Group Litigation (Crossley & Others v Volkswagen Aktiengesellschaft & Others), a claim on behalf of more than 90,000 UK owners of Volkswagen, Audi, Škoda and SEAT diesel vehicles fitted with emissions "defeat devices". A GLO was made in May 2018, and in April 2020 the High Court ruled that the vehicles' software did amount to an unlawful defeat device. The case became the template for later "pan-NOx" GLOs against other manufacturers, including Mercedes-Benz, BMW, Ford and Fiat Chrysler/Suzuki.
- Fuschillo and Others v Johnson & Johnson, a product liability claim by more than 3,000 UK claimants alleging that ovarian cancer and mesothelioma were caused by long-term use of Johnson's Baby Powder, which the claimants alleged contained asbestos. The High Court approved a GLO on 10 June 2026, appointing the claimant firm KP Law as lead solicitors for the group action; it was reported as the first GLO brought against J&J over its talc products in the UK.

A full list of current GLOs is available on Her Majesty's Courts Service website.
