= Horizon accounting system =

Accounting software, 1999

The Horizon accounting system is an accounting software and electronic point of sale (EPOS) system developed by Fujitsu for the Post Office in the UK. The problems with the Horizon system have been a central part of a group litigation in what is known as the British Post Office scandal.

The Post Office introduced Horizon around 1999/2000 as a new computerised system for the accounting function both in the Post Office branches, and between the branches and itself. This was (and still is) called Horizon.

== History ==
Horizon was preceded first by a computer system named ECCO+ (Electronic Cash Registers at Counters) and then Capture, both of which had been used in post offices throughout the 1990s.

ECCO+ was an offline, floppy disk based EPOS system on PC hardware, which was designed for use in Crown offices (directly managed branches, as opposed to sub offices). In its later years it was also used at some subpostmaster-run branches, which had been converted from Crown offices as part of the general reduction in the directly managed network. Capture was developed by Compaq, and had been rolled out to 300 post offices in 1995.

There have been two main versions of the Horizon system with radically different architectures from each other; the first in use from 1999 until 2010, and the second from 2010 onwards.

The first, known as Legacy Horizon within the Post Office Horizon IT Inquiry, was built on the Riposte product from Escher Group Ltd. Data was stored in the post office terminals, replicated between terminals and transmitted to servers in the data centres.

Business applications on Legacy Horizon (including EPOSS (EPOS Service), the accounting application) were written by Fujitsu. The history and poor state of the EPOSS software is described in 2001 in an internal Fujitsu document "Report on the EPOSS PinICL TaskForce".

The second version, known as Horizon Online or HNG-X, was a complete rewrite by Fujitsu, over several years up to 2010, using (as the name suggests) a fully online architecture, with all data held on a central database. An update to this, known as Horizon Anywhere or HNG-A, based on the same online architecture, was deployed in 2017 and is still in use in 2025.

== Horizon IT scandal ==
The Horizon IT scandal involved the Post Office pursuing thousands of innocent subpostmasters for apparent financial shortfalls caused by faults in Horizon. More than 900 subpostmasters were wrongfully convicted of theft, fraud and false accounting based on faulty Horizon data.

== Functionality ==
Horizon is a large and complex business system that has evolved over a long period of time. It contains both an accounting system as well as hundreds of so-called business applications, one for each of the Post Office’s clients: high-street banks, the National Lottery operator, gas and electricity companies, etc. These applications provide the necessary functionality to buy a lottery ticket, pay a bill, etc. in the branch, and the associated back office activity of settling with the client organisation.

Horizon has the concept of a customer carrying out a virtual basket of activities and paying for them in one transaction, for instance, paying a bill and buying some stamps. However, if the branch is also selling groceries, newspapers, etc. these are not supported by Horizon and must be purchased as a separate transaction on a separate EPOSS.

As well as point-of-sale activities, Horizon also supports a process of balancing and rollover of the monthly trading period for each branch. At the start of each period the branch is supposed to be “in balance” meaning that the stock and cash in the branch agrees with the information in the Horizon system.

== Horizon issues ==
The issues with the Horizon system was the focus of Judgement No.6 of the Post Office Group Litigation. The Post Office maintained that the system was robust and was extremely unlikely to have caused the unexplained shortfalls and discrepancies in the branch accounts as claimed by the subpostmasters. The judge disagreed and ruled that Horizon contained bugs, errors, or defects that had caused discrepancies in the subpostmasters' accounts.

Fujitsu was and still is responsible for maintaining the Horizon system and uses an incident management system called "Peak" (successor to "Pinnacle") to track reported problems. An issue registered in the system is referred to as a "PEAK". It also maintains a knowledge base called the Known Error Log (KEL) for documenting known issues with the system. A known error registered in the log is called a "KEL". During the Horizon Issues trial, PEAKs and KELs were a primary source of information about the issues with the Horizon system.
