= Payzone (United Kingdom) =

British payment acceptance company

Payzone Bill Payments Limited
- Type: Subsidiary
- Traded as: Formerly LSE: PAYZ
- Industry: Financial services
- Predecessor: Payzone (Ireland)
- Founded: 1989; 37 years ago
- Headquarters: Northwich, Cheshire, United Kingdom
- Area served: United Kingdom
- Products: Payment network, bill payment service, payment terminals
- Parent: Post Office Limited
- Website: www.payzone.co.uk

Payzone UK branded as Payzone is a British consumer payments acceptance network that has been part of Post Office Limited since 2018.

Payzone UK is primarily engaged in the acceptance of cash payments for the services of its partners through specialised terminals at its retailer network. Their main services include mobile phone top-up, International calling cards, bus ticket purchase, utility and general bill payment and pre-paid cards.

== History ==
The company was founded in 1989 and ran a number of businesses in the UK, Ireland, Sweden, Greece and Romania. In 2010, the private equity company Duke Street Capital purchased the company and split the business into different areas that would eventually lead to the split of the UK payment acceptance network into a separate business.

In 2018, the UK post office acquired the UK payment business from Payzone's owner after it was split from the Irish Payzone (Ireland) business.

In 2019, the company won a contract to provide payment services to British Gas, from its main rival Paypoint, specifically for pre-paid cards for gas and electricity meters. The switch over to Payzone caused a number issues for customers. Stories in the press showed people ended up without heating for several days as they were no longer able to top their prepaid utility meter.

By 2020, the company had expanded its network to over 24,000 partnered stores across the UK. In 2021, following on from the British Gas contract, Payzone also won a contract to replace its main rival PayPoint at Tesco stores.

== Operations ==
Payzone works with Elavon Merchant Services for payment processing.

The company provides a network of Payzone locations across the UK that allow clients to come in and pay bills, top up pre-paid cards and deposit cash and other payment services. The Payzone locations are post offices, convenience stores and supermarkets that act as independent agents and host the Payzone terminal.

Payzone supplies a specialised payment terminal to its customer base of retail outlets in the ‘convenience sector’ that accept payments on behalf of its partners. Customers in the convenience sector are typically convenience stores, newsagents and off-licences. Payzone's partners include mobile network operators, utility companies and public transport organisations. Consumers use Payzone's network of terminals (placed with its business customers) to pay for services provided by its partners such as mobile phone top-ups, international calling cards, gas payments, electricity payments, water payments, housing payments, online gaming vouchers and The Health Lottery tickets. The same Payzone terminals also support credit and debit card acceptance for goods and services that the convenience business sells directly to its own customers.
