= Pedro Proscurcin =

Lawyer and law professor

Pedro Proscurcin (born 21 March 1943) is a Brazilian lawyer and emeritus law professor. He served as Professor of Labour Law at the Álvares Penteado School of Commerce Foundation (FECAP) in Sao Paulo. His work is in the field of Individual and Collective Labour Law, Contracts (esp. relational contract and social rights) and Labour Economics (Economic Law).

His last book The Right to Information in Labor Relations (Direito à Informação nas Relações de Trabalho) (2022) deals with the Brazilian constitutional right to information in the context of labor relations.

== Education ==
Proscurcin obtained his Bachelor of Laws degree in 1972 from United Metropolitan Colleges (FMU) and his Master's and Doctorate degrees in Law from the Pontifical Catholic University of Sao Paulo (PUC-SP), where he also specialized in Collective Labour Law. As the son of Russian Bessarabian immigrants, Proscurcin received his university education while also working at Companhia Brasileira de Material Ferroviário (Cobrasma) in the industrial city of Osasco, located in Greater São Paulo.

== Career ==
After working at Cobrasma (1958–1967), Proscurcin served as a city councilor in Osasco (1967–1970). At that time, he participated in the city's labour movement that culminated in the historic Cobrasma strike in 1968. In 1976 he ran for mayor of the city, but he had to abandon his candidacy due to political persecution by the military dictatorship. For many years Proscurcin worked as a lawyer for unions (e.g., Metalworkers' Union of Osasco) and companies (e.g., Companhia Brasileira de Distribuição, Mercedes-Benz Brasil), eventually establishing his own law firm.

Starting in the 1990s, Proscurcin was a professor at several higher education institutions, such as Faculdades Hoyler (1995–1999), Universidade do Grande ABC (2001) and UniCesumar (Postgraduate Program). He taught in the areas of Labour Law, Constitutional Law, Commercial Law, Corporate Law, and Economic Law. Later, he taught Labour Law at the United Metropolitan Colleges (FMU) in the city of São Paulo, both at the undergraduate and graduate levels (2002–2007). Finally, he became a professor in the areas of Labour Law and Social Security Law at Fundação Escola de Comércio Álvares Penteado (FECAP) in São Paulo (since 2001). He is currently a professor emeritus at FECAP.

== Works ==
=== Books ===
- Direito à Informação nas Relações de Trabalho, ISBN 978-85-362-9647-0 (2022).
- Compêndio de Direito do Trabalho: Introdução às Relações de Trabalho, 3rd. expand. ed., ISBN 978-85-361-8544-6 (2015).
- Compêndio de Direito do Trabalho: Introdução às Relações de Trabalho, 2nd. expand. ed., ISBN 978-85-361-1652-5 (2011).
- Compêndio de Direito do Trabalho: introdução às relações de trabalho em transição à nova era tecnológica, 1st. ed., ISBN 978-85-361-0948-0(2007).
- Do contrato de trabalho ao contrato de atividade: nova forma de regulação das atividades do mercado de trabalho, ISBN 978-85-361-0450-8 (2003).
- O Trabalho na Reestruturação Produtiva, ISBN 978-85-361-0076-0 (2001).
- Trabalho em grupo semi-autônomo, (1995).

=== Selected articles ===
- A quarteirização da aprendizagem. Revista LTr., Legislação do Trabalho, v. 71, pp. 796–800, 2007.
- A ilusão da atual autonomia coletiva privada. Revista LTr, São Paulo, v. 69, n. 09, pp. 1088–1097, 2005.
- Desafios do direito do trabalho na pós-modernidade. FMU Direito, São Paulo, v. 18, n.26, pp. 113–133, 2004.
- A tutela do estado profissional e do mercado de trabalho: inclusão social pelo trabalho. Revista LTr., Legislação do Trabalho, v. 67, n.11, pp. 1296–1305, 2003.
- O fim da Subordinação Clássica no Direito do Trabalho. Revista LTr. Legislação do Trabalho, São Paulo, v. 65, 2001.
- A moderna organização do trabalho: evolução e reflexos no mercado de trabalho. Revista Álvares Penteado, São Paulo, v. 3, n. 7, pp. 63–80, 2001.
- A flexibilização Laboral no Direito do Trabalho Brasileiro. Suplemento Trabalhista LTr, n.168, 1998.
- Razões que dificultam a implantação do contrato coletivo de trabalho no Brasil. Suplemento Trabalhista LTr, v. XXVI, 1990.
