= Vested outsourcing =

Vested outsourcing is a hybrid business model in which contracting parties create a formal relational contract using shared values and goals and outcome-based economics to create an agreement that is mutually beneficial for each party.

Proponents of the vested outsourcing model argue that traditional outsourcing and businesses relationships are focused on win-lose arrangements where one party benefits at the other's expense. In contrast, a Vested agreement creates a win-win relationship in which both parties are equally invested in one another's success.

== History ==
The model was developed out of research by the University of Tennessee led by Kate Vitasek.

The Vested approach is firmly rooted in relational contract theory, which was originally developed in the United States by the legal scholars Ian Roderick Macneil and Stewart Macaulay. Relational contract theory is characterized by a view of contracts as relations rather than as discrete transactions.

Harvard University Professor and Nobel Laureate Oliver Hart’s 2019 article (with David Frydlinger and Kate Vitasek) in the September-October edition of the Harvard Business Review, “A New Approach to Contracts”, argues for the adoption of a different kind of contracting arrangement: a formal relational contract that specifies mutual goals and establishes governance structures to keep the parties’ expectations and interests aligned over the long term. The article notes that nearly 60 companies have employed the vested methodology.

Vested outsourcing applies in a variety of industries and has been adopted by companies like Procter & Gamble, McDonald's, Microsoft, Dell and FedEx.

== Process ==
The vested formal relational contract process includes steps to lay the foundation and helps contracting parties stay in continual alignment by establishing a “partnership mentality” which engenders an environment of mutual trust, a shared vision and objectives, adoption of guiding principles, and alignment of expectations and interests. A shared-value mindset is the basis of a vested outsourcing agreement. The contract itself follows five rules based on the Tennessee research on the topic that began in 2003:

- agreements should be outcome focussed
- focus on the "what" not the "how"
- desired outcomes should be clearly defined and measurable
- pricing model incentives should be optimised for cost/service tradeoffs
- governance should be based on insight rather than oversight.

The parties must agree upon one or more "desired outcomes" which can be objectively measured to determine if the relationship is successful. This outcome can include cost reductions, revenue increases, schedule improvements, increased market share and better levels of customer service.

More than simply focusing on the success of the contract relationship, the Vested approach commits both the company and the service provider to the success of each other's overall business. This strengthens the sense of partnership and encourages a more lasting relationship. By sharing their expertise and aligning their goals, both parties are able to drive innovation, adapt to changing needs and mitigate risk while working towards mutual success.

Vested relationships depend on collaboration, transparency, flexibility and trust. Rather than traditional business relationships in which companies buy transactions or services from suppliers, vested relationships instead focus on buying results.
