= Nigel Railton =

British business executive (born 1967)

Chair of Post Office Limited
- Incumbent
- Assumed office May 2024
- Preceded by: Henry Staunton

Personal details
- Born: January 1967 (age 59)
- Occupation: Business executive

Nigel Railton (born January 1967) is a British accountant and business executive who has been chair of Post Office Limited since May 2024. Previously, he had a long career with lottery operator Camelot Group where he was chief executive of Camelot UK from 2017 to 2023.

== Early life ==
Railton was born in January 1967 and brought up in Crewe, Cheshire, where the family lived in a council flat. On leaving school at age 16 he joined British Rail, a significant employer in the town, to work in a signal box before moving into a clerical role. He moved into accounting roles, and while continuing to work for British Rail, he took night classes in management accounting, leading to a CIMA qualification in 1995.

== Career ==
After leaving British Rail in 1995, Railton worked at Black and Decker UK and then Daewoo Motors. In 1998, he joined Camelot, the operator of the UK's National Lottery, where he became finance director in 2006. From 2014 he was CEO of Camelot Global, responsible for the group's operations outside the UK, then in November 2017 was appointed as CEO of Camelot UK Lotteries Limited. He described his role as leading a "turnaround and relative rebuilding of the business" at a time of declining sales and reduced market share.

He left Camelot in February 2023, around the time that Camelot UK was acquired by Allwyn Entertainment, following the 2022 decision by the Gambling Commission to award the renewal of the National Lottery franchise to Allwyn.

In May 2024, Railton was appointed by Kemi Badenoch, Secretary of State for Business and Trade, as interim chair (for 12 months) of the state-owned body Post Office Limited, replacing Henry Staunton who had been sacked by Badenoch in January. At this time the Post Office was involved in paying compensation to its branch operators who had been accused, and in many cases prosecuted, because of faults in the Horizon computer system. The scandal was the subject of an ongoing public inquiry, and the Post Office was facing increased costs and delays in its project to replace Horizon. Soon after taking up the role, Railton launched a strategic review into the future of the business which was expected to be discussed with the government in October 2024. In May 2025, Railton was appointed as the permanent chair, contracted until May 2028.

Railton was non-executive chair of Argentex Group, a company providing risk management to businesses in the areas of foreign exchange and interest rates, which he joined as a non-executive director in 2019. He had past non-executive appointments at Uthingo (South Africa) and at Premier Lotteries Ireland.

He joined the Board of The Social Mobility Foundation in July 2023.
