= Vitásek =

Vitásek is a Czech surname. The female form is Vitásková. Notable people with the surname include:

- Jan August Vitásek (1770–1839), Czech composer
- Kate Vitasek (born 1968), American author and educator
- Petr Vitásek (born 1981), Czech rower
- Ondřej Vitásek, Czech ice hockey player
