= Transcash =

Transcash may refer to:

- UK, the Alliance & Leicester Transcash system, see Post Office Ltd#Bill payments
- USA, a brand of prepaid debit card, see Debit card#Prepaid debit cards
