= Relational contract =

Legal theory that ongoing contracts are founded on the relationship between the parties

A relational contract is a contract whose effect is based upon a relationship of trust between the parties. The explicit terms of a relational contract are an outline, while implicit terms and understandings determine the behaviour of the parties. Relational contract theory was originally developed in the United States by the legal scholars Ian Roderick Macneil and Stewart Macaulay. Richard Austen-Baker has more recently proposed a developed version of relational contract theory, called "comprehensive contract theory."

== Ian Roderick Macneil's Original theory ==
Relational contract theory was originally developed in the United States by the legal scholars Ian Roderick Macneil and Stewart Macaulay. According to Macneil, the theory offered a response to the so-called "The Death of Contract" school's nihilistic argument that a contract was not a fit subject for study as a whole; each different type of contract (e.g., sales, employment, negotiable instruments) could be studied individually, but not "contracts-in-gross."

Macneil explains that this is only one of a number of possible relational theories of contracts, and accordingly renamed his own version "essential contract theory".

Relational contract theory is characterized by a view of contracts as relations rather than as discrete transactions (which, Macneil argued, traditional "classical" or "neo-classical contract" theory treats contracts as being). Thus, even a simple transaction can properly be understood as involving a wider social and economic context. For instance, if A purchases a packet of cigarettes from a shop he has never been into before and will never enter again, that seems quite discrete. However, A will almost certainly have a loyalty to a particular brand of cigarettes and expectations about quality about which he would be prepared to complain to the manufacturer, although he has no contractual privity with the manufacturer. There is also an understanding that A will pay for the cigarettes, not simply run off with them, and that if he tenders a £10 note in exchange for the cigarettes which are priced at £6, the paper money will be acceptable and change of £4 will be given. None of this is explicitly stated between the parties, whose conversation is likely limited to "20 Marlboro, please" on A's part and "That'll be £6, please" on the part of the retailer. Thus, even the simplest transaction has a good deal that is unstated and dependent on a wider web of social and economic relations. How far outwards into that web one needs to investigate will depend on the transaction and on the purpose for which it is being examined.

Incentives play a large roll in the efficacy of a relational contract. If there were no relational contract where future compensation, performance or plans are only promised and not guaranteed, then there is very little incentive to honour the deal and perform. However, with a relational contract parties have incentive to provide quality goods/services as part of an ongoing relationship of good faith that will be beneficial to both parties.

Although earlier writings may be taken in places to suggest that the substantive rules of contract law need to be reframed to acknowledge the relational, non-discrete nature of contracts, this has not been subsequently pursued and current scholars have argued that it is neither possible nor necessary to reform the law of contract itself to work effectively with relationally-constituted contracts.

Other characteristics of relational contract theory are that "contract" is understood to cover economic exchange in general, not just contracts that would be recognized as legally enforceable agreements by courts in any given jurisdiction, that relations are mostly held together by their own internal values and wider social/economic factors, and, at least in relational theory in the Macneil mold, that exchange relations are governed by a number of norms. This last is not to say that relational contract theory is normative in nature, setting out what ought to be the case properly, but rather that there are actual observable normal characteristics or factors at play in relations. Macneil's essential contract theory offers some 14 norms. These norms are as follows:

1. Role Integrity
2. Reciprocity
3. Implementation of Planning
4. Effectuation of Consent
5. Flexibility
6. Contractual Solidarity
7. The 'Linking Norms'
8. The Power Norm
9. Propriety of Means
10. Harmonisation with the Social Matrix
11. Enhancing Discreteness and Presentation
12. Preservation of the Relation
13. Harmonisation of Relational Conflict
14. Supracontract Norms.

== Comprehensive contract theory ==
The English contracts scholar Richard Austen-Baker proposed in 2009 a developed version of relational contract theory, called "comprehensive contract theory", which posits four "comprehensive contract norms" in place of Macneil's 14, though Austen-Baker does not deny the validity of Macneil's norms as a complex tool of analysis. While Austen-Baker appreciates Macneil's norms, the four that he proposes aims to eliminate the large amount of overlap seen in Macneil's version of the norms. Here the "comprehensive contract theory" norms have a much wider scope as to not extend over the other norms. These four norms are:

1. preservation of the relation
2. harmonisation with the social matrix
3. satisfying performance expectations
4. substantial fairness.

As Austen-Baker builds his theory, developing Macneil's work a cross-over can be seen from the two lists of norms. This is norm one and two in "comprehensive contract theory". While they have the same title the meaning changes from Macneil's work. The first norm, preservation of the relation pertains to the advantages gained through better relations. There are seven reasons that Austen-Baker gives, the first being that there is an increased cost in trying to find new customers as opposed to retaining existing ones. The second is that outside of existing relations transaction costs could be higher. Another point offered is that the inconvenience and cognitive effort of changing suppliers incentivises maintaining the relationship. Furthermore Austen-Baker explains the benefit of a long-term and meaningful relationship as parties will be better able to understand and advise each other for their specific needs. Some forms of business require high levels of trust which is hard to establish therefore encouraging relational contracts. Non-economic satisfactions also increase with the use of relational contracts, this could be seen as joy from going to a regular store and speaking with a manager that you know well. Finally, there is much greater stability gained through the longevity of a relationship. The second norm is the harmonisation with the social matrix, this norm seeks to encompass the use of every norm known to man to apply to contracts. It is unclear how much would be possible in a contract with this norm, therefore deters people from trying it. The third norm is satisfying the performance expectations, this explains how adequate or better performance is satisfactory however if you were to fail to meet the requirement you could be obliged to pay for any damages due to the reduced quality of work. Which in turn could tarnish the relationship. The final norm is substantial fairness, which is the equality of the relationship. If something is given then it would be fair for something to be given back in exchange, this does not have to be formal and could be inclusive of something like customary behaviour.

A persistent puzzle in the contracting literature is the gap between normative accounts of cooperation (trust, mutuality, role integrity) and operational mechanisms that reliably produce these behaviours at scale. Much of the recent popularisation credits "formal relational contracting" with solving this puzzle. Yet the codification of contract-native "statements of intent and principles," outcomes-aligned governance, and rules of engagement appeared years earlier in The Vested Outsourcing Manual (2011), co-authored by Vitasek, Crawford (Archer), Nyden, and Kawamoto. That manual operationalised a practical synthesis—principles, outcomes, and governance. The book brought new thinking, 10 key elements required for deeply collaborative business relationships and how to craft those elements into a flexible, relationship based contracting scaffold that shares evolving expertise, manages change, and promotes the right behaviours to jointly drive innovation and mitigate risk in complex and interdependent commercial relationships.

The 10 Elements

1.Business model - scale of complexity / interdependence defining the optimal delivery model.

2. Shared vision and statement of intent - contractual commitment to a dynamic collaborative relationship, shared purpose, mutual trust, open communication, integrity, sharing of resources to close capability gaps, collaborative mind-set, reciprocal flexibility, risk / reward sharing, guardrails and governance feedback loops that survive organisation changes and mutual adjustments in uncertainty.

3. Objectives / work allocation - work allocated to the party best able to deliver the intended outcomes.

4. Measureable outcomes - a limited set of high level measured results and metrics that matter.

5. Performance management - formal governance mechanism that measures delivery of outcomes, with proactive problem solving procedures.

6. Pricing model and incentives - flexible model with gainshare and profit directly tied to achievement of outcomes, smart risk allocation and best value based on intangibles such as social responsibility.

7. Relationship management - policies to maintain collaborative relationships, attitudes and behaviours.

8. Transformation management - ecosystem that rewards risk mitigation, improvements, an agile culture of innovation, no blame approach, with change control and formal reviews.

9. Exit management - keeping the parties whole in the event of separation not due to poor performance.

10. Special considerations - flexible governance framework, health and safety, continuity, IT, security and location specific considerations.

The Japanese scholar Takashi Uchida has proposed a version of relational contract theory inspired by Macneil, relating it to the Japanese situation. Other notable contributions to relational contract theory have been made by Stewart Macaulay (U.S.), Lisa Bernstein (U.S.), David Campbell (England) and John Wightman (England). It is also worth mentioning the distinct approaches of Ronaldo Porto Macedo Jr. (Brazil), who has dealt with the theory in the field of consumer protection law, and Pedro Proscurcin (Brazil), who has introduced the theory of activity contracts in the field of labor law. Still in the field of labor law, the most recent works of Douglas Brodie (Scotland), Hugh Collins (England) and Anthony Davidson Gray (Australia) deserve to be highlighted.

Recent research from World Commerce & Contracting, the University of Tennessee and Cirio law firm takes the relational contracting theories expressed by Macneil, Macaulay and others to make them relevant for contracting practitioners trying to craft strategic, collaborative, win-win relationships with their procurement and outsourced business partners. The white paper, outlines basic tenets that are foundational to relational contracting, including communication, risk allocation, problem-solving, no-blame culture, joint working, gain and pain sharing, mutual objectives, performance measurement and continuous improvement.

In 2019, David Frydlinger, Oliver Hart and Kate Vitasek collaborated on a Harvard Business Review article, "A New Approach to Contracts: How to Build Better long-term strategic partnerships". The authors advocated for a "formal" relational contract, asserting that "a formal relational contract lays a foundation of trust, specifies mutual goals, and establishes governance structures to keep the parties' expectations and interests aligned over time."

Further research on relational contracting resulted in the 2021 book Contracting in the New Economy: Using Relational Contracts to Boost Trust and Collaboration in Strategic Business Relationships. The book argues for adopting formal relational contracts as an alternative to transactional contracts and suggests formal relational contracts are well suited for strategic, complex and highly dependent contractual relationships. The Nobel laureate Oliver Hart's foreword in the book notes, "...for a long time I have felt that the traditional approach to contracts, where lawyers try to think of all the possible things that can go wrong in a relationship and include contractual provisions to deal with them, is broken." Hart added that it "never worked that well, and in an increasingly complex and uncertain world it works even worse."

The book provides a comprehensive review into the history and theory behind relational contracting and provides a practitioner's perspective that includes a five-step process for developing a relational contract:

- Adopt guiding principles.
- Align expectations and interests
- Create a shared vision and objectives
- Lay the foundation
- Stay aligned

== Examples of relational contracts ==
=== Construction Examples ===
- AIA C191-2009 Standard Form Multi-Party Agreement for IPD (USA)
- AIA C199-2010 Standard Form of Agreement Between Single Purpose Entity and Contractor for Integrated Project Delivery
- FFG Enterprise: a collaboration underpinned by a relational contract between the Royal Australian Navy, Defense Industry, and the Capability, Acquisition and Sustainment Group (CASG)
- Alliancing Agreement (Australia) - not yet a standard form but moving in that direction
- ConsensusDocs 300 (USA) - a derivative of IFoA
- Integrated Form of Agreement (IFoA) (USA) - developed for Sutter Health projects in California and used by some other healthcare providers
- Integrated Project Delivery Agreement (Profit Deferred Until Final Completion) (USA)
- The New Engineering Contract (NEC)'s family of standard contracts aims to stimulate good management of the relationship between the contracting parties in a construction and engineering context.
- PPC2000 International (UK)
- U.S Department of Energy - transformation of a former weapons facility to a wildlife refuge

=== Other Examples ===
- In the United Kingdom, the High Court stated in 2019 that "the contractual relationship between the Post Office and [its] sub-postmasters was a relational contract that imposed an implied duty of good faith on both parties".

== See also ==
- Ian Roderick Macneil
