= British Indoor Karting Championship =

- Category: Indoor kart racing
- Country: United Kingdom
- Inaugural season: 2020
- Official website: Official website

The British Indoor Karting Championship (BIKC) is a national indoor karting championship in the United Kingdom. Organised by Motorsport UK, the championship aims to provide an accessible and affordable pathway for drivers to compete for official British titles across multiple age and weight categories.

The championship is an arrive and drive championship and uses the standard professional rental fleet provided at TeamSport Indoor Karting venues. Depending on the specific track drivers drive either petrol or electric karts which are supplied by the British manufacturer BIZ Karts.

== History ==
The BIKC was established in June 2020 after a partnership between TeamSport Indoor Karting and Motorsport UK, the national governing body for four-wheel motorsport in the UK. It was created to provide the first official, affordable, and recognized national title for indoor karting in the UK. Qualifying for the first championship opened on 1 July 2020 despite the COVID-19 pandemic, with competitors setting lap times at participating TeamSport indoor venues across the UK. The season extended over a period of 340 days that concluded with the National Final held at TeamSport Warrington on 6 June 2021.

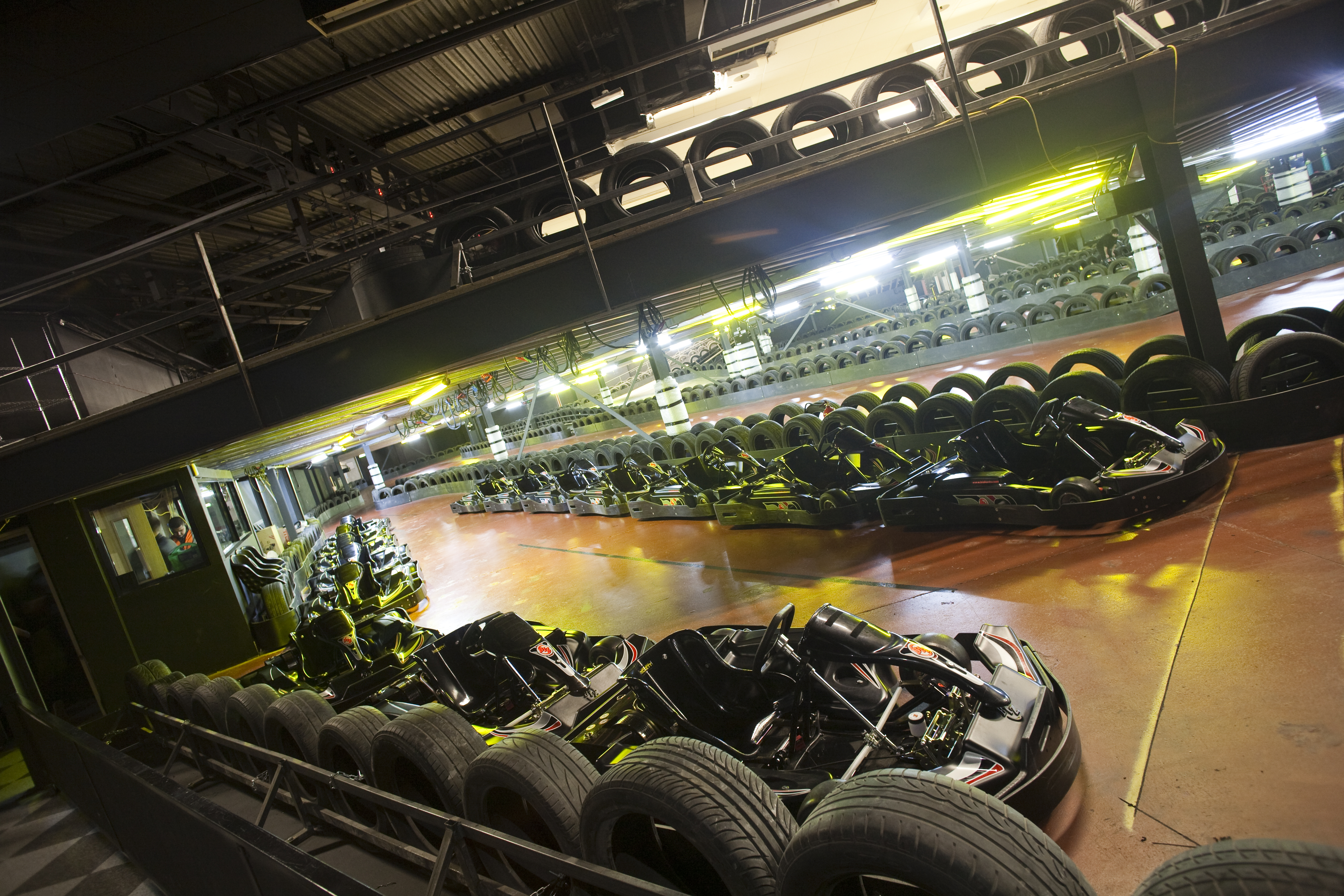
TeamSport Indoor Karting Tower Bridge, where petrol karts supplied by BIZ Karts are visible.

After the first season, the championship continued into 2021, with events being held at indoor tracks under the structure established for the first season. In 2022, the size of the series expanded, with qualifying rounds being staged at 35 venues across the country. Competitors who qualify through local events then go through to the regional stages and then onto the National Final.

The championship continued to operate in similar form through the 2023 and 2024 seasons. For the 2024 season adjustments were made to category definitions in response to feedback from competitors which refined weight categories.

For the 2025 championship qualifying sessions commenced on 1 June 2025. Drivers were required to hold a Motorsport UK K‑I licence and a TeamSport membership that permitted entry into the series. The National Final was scheduled for later in the year after local and regional elimination rounds. The results from the 2025 National Final included the Lightweight Runner‑Up position being attained by Megan Rowledge who was noted on the official series site as the first female driver to achieve a podium placement.

Qualifying begins for the 2026 championship on 1 June 2026 and closes on 31st August 2026.

== Format ==
The BIKC is a four-stage knockout competition. The competition starts with a three-lap qualifying session, which is conducted from June to August. Here, drivers compete by recording their three best average lap times over separate days. The winners of the qualifying session compete in the Local Finals, which are conducted using the Mini GP+ format, consisting of a practice session, a qualifying session, and a racing session, all of 15 minutes each.

The winners of the Local Finals compete in the Regional Finals, consisting of three four-minute qualifying sessions, followed by an eight-minute heat, a twelve-minute semi-final, and a fifteen-minute grand final. The National Final is conducted over two days, with the best three drivers of each class of the Regional Finals racing for the title. The drivers compete in three classes: Cadet (below 12 years), Junior (12 to 16 years), and Adult (above 16 years), with the adult drivers further being divided into weight categories of Light, Mid, and Heavy. Biz EcoVolt GT electric karts are used for racing, and they are provided with adjustable speeds. Weight checks are also performed at all stages of the competition.

== Eligibility ==
Competitors must be at least eight years old to participate in the Cadet division, must be at least twelve to participate in the Junior division, and must be at least sixteen to participate in the adult weighted division. Competitors must also have a valid TeamSport Elite/Race Academy Membership and a Motorsport UK K-1 Licence.
