= Great Rail Journeys =

Tourism in the United Kingdom

- Type: Private
- Industry: Tour operator
- Founded: 1973
- Headquarters: York, UK.
- Key people: Dave Riley (CEO); Jonathan Skolnick (CFO); Lisa Wood (Marketing Director); Julian Appleyard (Commercial Director); Kerry Jenkins (IT Director); Steve Lee (Operations Director)
- Products: Escorted Rail Tours
- Owner: Vitruvian Partners
- Number of employees: 130+
- Subsidiaries: Rail Discoveries, GRJ Independent, Great Cruise Journeys, Vacations By Rail
- Website: www.greatrail.com

Great Rail Journeys, based in York, United Kingdom, is a tour operator that offers escorted rail tour holidays. In 2025 they offered routes in over 40 countries.

== History ==
The company started in 1973 as a family business. In 2013 ECI Partners made an investment in the company aimed at growing the brand internationally.

In July 2018 ECI sold its stake in Great Rail Journeys to Duke Street Capital for a sum of around 100 million pounds. Great Rail Journeys then announced the following year that they had purchased the Chicago-based Vacations by Rail. They subsequently shut down their previous headquarters in New York to consolidate operations in Chicago.

Vitruvian Partners purchased the company from Duke Street in 2025.
