= David Campbell (legal academic) =

British professor of law

David Campbell (born 1958) is a British professor of law who joined Lancaster University in 2013 from Leeds University. Before Leeds he was professor at Durham University where he was for a time Head of the Law Department. Prior to Durham he had been professorial fellow at Cardiff University, had briefly held the Chair of Common Law at Leeds University and had been professor of law at Sheffield Hallam University.

Campbell graduated B.Sc. (Econ) from Cardiff University in 1980, which was followed by an LLM from the University of Michigan Law School and a PhD from the University of Edinburgh. Since 1985, he has taught at a number of British universities and in Australia, Hong Kong and Spain.

His subject area is English contract law. He emphasizes relationships between contract law and free markets and has written extensively on relational contract theory.

== Controversy ==
Campbell became Head of Department at Durham in June 2005, a year after joining the faculty. In that role, he oversaw a change to the structure of the curriculum. He was pressed to stand down in October 2007 following a university management review. Campbell gave up the Headship in early December 2007. Campbell was described as having an "idiosyncratic" style of management by former colleagues.
