= Payzone (Ireland) =

Irish payment service provider

Payzone Ireland
- Type: Private
- Traded as: Formerly LSE: PAYZ
- Industry: Financial services
- Predecessor: Alphyra, ITG Group
- Founded: 1989; 37 years ago
- Headquarters: Dublin, Ireland
- Area served: Ireland
- Products: Payment network, cash acceptance, EFT, online payments, ATM.
- Number of employees: 79 (2019)
- Parent: Allied Irish Banks (AIB) and Fiserv (joint venture)
- Website: www.payzone.ie

Payzone is an Irish consumer payment service provider company based in Dublin. The company processes electronic transactions, including debit and credit card transactions mobile phone top ups, M50 motorway toll payments, Leap travel cards, local property tax payments, pay-by-phone parking, pre-paid and bill pay utility and parcel collection services.

As of 2019, the company employed approximately 80 people in Ireland. Based in Sandyford, it is a subsidiary of a joint venture between Allied Irish Banks and Fiserv.

== History ==
Payzone old logo used between 2007 and 2022

The company was founded in 1989 as ITG Group. It operated as ITG Group until 1999 and then operated as Alphyra (1999-2007) and was listed on the London Stock Exchange under ticker LSE: PAYZ.

By 2006, the Payzone Group had two businesses. The first was a managed terminal network in the UK, Ireland, Sweden, Greece and Romania. Its main services included mobile phone top-up, utility top-up, bill-payment solutions, electronic gift vouchers and electronic funds transfer processing. The second business was an independent white-label ATM's in the convenience sector in the UK and Germany.

In 2010, the company was acquired by Duke Street Capital in a debt for equity deal, Duke Street started the process of splitting up the business so that each business could focus on its own market.

In August 2014, Payzone sold its Swedish business to NETS, and its Greek subsidiary to OPAP.

In 2015, Duke Street Capital sold Payzone to the investments company Carlyle Cardinal Ireland for €43.3m.

Payzone sold its Romanian subsidiary in October 2017 to competitor PayPoint.

In 2018, the UK payment side of the business was split off and sold to the UK post office company Post Office Limited, creating a separate entity Payzone (United Kingdom) that continues to use the same brand name in the United Kingdom but is no longer connected with Payzone Ireland.

In 2019, the Irish company was acquired through a joint venture between AIB and US company First Data, with the companies holding 75% and 25% respectively. Later in 2019, First Data was acquired by Fiserv.

== Products ==
Payzone's products and services include:

- Retail services - Payzone provides payment terminals to retailers, via which customers make payments for mobile phone top ups, M50 motorway toll payments, Leap travel cards, some gift cards, local property tax payments, parking fees, pre-paid and bill-pay utilities, waste payments and parcel collection services. The terminals also support credit and debit card acceptance for goods and services that retailers sell directly to their customers.
- Credit and debit card processing - It also provides terminals to small to medium-sized businesses in the 'general retail' sector (beauty salons, clothing stores, restaurants, etc) that allow those businesses to accept credit and debit card payments.
- Online payments - It also provides services to retailers to process transactions online. These include online toll payments, prepaid electricity and transport ticketing.
- Mobile payments - Payzone operates a mobile payment service, which uses SMS, mobile app and interactive voice response, for Pinergy and Electric Ireland. It also owns and operates Parking Tag, a cashless mobile service which allows motorists to pay for parking in certain locations.
