= ERS (insurance company) =

- Company type: Privately held company
- Industry: Insurance
- Founded: 1946
- Headquarters: London, England
- Key people: Peter Bilsby (Chief Executive officer)
- Number of employees: 680
- Parent: Aquiline Capital Partners
- Website: ers.com

ERS is a specialist personal, commercial and agricultural motor insurer. It has been providing insurance products for more than 70 years and now provides cover solely via Lloyd's Syndicate 218. ERS offers a diverse range of products, including private car, classic car, van, motorcycle, taxi, minibus, fleet, haulage, agricultural vehicle and motor breakdown.

== History ==
ERS began life in 1946 as Equity Motor Policies, a Lloyd's syndicate. In 1987 the company merged with Red Star to form Equity Red Star. Nine years later the company was bought by Cox Insurance, a Lloyd's underwriting business specialising in nuclear, marine and catastrophe insurance.

In 2002, following losses incurred due to 9/11, Cox Insurance withdrew from its commercial insurance activity to focus on personal lines. The business raised new equity capital to support its motor underwriting operation.

A management buyout of the business in 2005 led to a new focus and a new name, Equity Insurance Group – led by CEO, Neil Utley – backed by investors Englefield and Duke Street Capital. It was headquartered at Brentwood, Essex. Further facilities are located in Colchester and Swansea. The group's high street broking network was rebranded, converging Bennetts, Insure-shop and JMW to become Equity Insurance Brokers.

On 4 December 2006, Australian insurer Insurance Australia Group announced that it would acquire Equity Insurance Group for £570 million and Open + Direct Insurance Services, the largest retail broking operation in Northern Ireland.. The acquisition was completed on 8 January 2007 and Neil Utley, then CEO, joined the executive team of IAG. IAG also acquired Barnett & Barnett in 2008, and went on to dispose of its branch-based broking in 2009.

In May 2012, IAG sold Barnett & Barnett and the NBJ Broking arm. In April 2013 US private equity company Aquiline Capital Partners purchased Equity Insurance Group from IAG for £80 million. This led to the sale of EDBL and its personal accident and household business to Canopius. In April 2014, Equity Insurance Group rebranded to ERS and became a "motor only, broker only" insurer. It now operates solely as an A+ rated Lloyd's syndicate 218.[1]

In 2014 ERS underwent structural changes consolidating ERS’ offices into two locations (London and Swansea). Only servicing for ERS’ direct classic car arm, RH Insurance, remains in Brentwood

== Financial ==
2014

ERS announced a full calendar year profit of £8.3m, the first it has reported since 2009 and a £28m improvement year on year. The combined ratio improved by 6.6% to 101% from the prior year, with improvements across all ratios but the majority of improvement coming from the loss ratio. Gross written premiums £388m, down from £406m.

ERS has approved the closure of its 2012 year of account with a small profit, £1.4m, 0.3% of capacity. This is the first year of account since 2007 to close with a profit and is an improvement on the forecast provided last year which was for a small loss of £1.1m or 0.2% of capacity. The forecast released for the 2013 year of account remains a small loss of 0.9% of capacity with a forecast of −5.9% to +4.1%. This is an improvement on the forecast at the same point last year which was −7.3% to +2.7% and also an improvement on the Q3 2014 forecast.

2015

The calendar year profit for 2015 was 6.0m and the combined ratio improved to 99.8% (2014: 101%) and is below 100% for the first time since 2009, with improvements across all ratios but the majority of improvement coming from the loss ratio. Gross written premiums £394m, an increase of 2% from 2014.

ERS has approved the closure of its 2013 year of account with a profit, £10.7m, 2.4% of capacity, this is an improvement from a year ago which forecast 2013 as a small loss of 0.9% of capacity and a range of −5.9% to +4.1%. The current forecast released for the 2014 year of account remains a loss of 3.4% of capacity with a forecast of −8.4% to +1.6%.

== Awards ==
ERS has received the following national awards:

- 2014 Brand Campaign of the Year (Insurer to Broker) – Insurance Times Awards
- 2016 Technology Champion of the Year (Individual, Tim Yorke) – Tech and Innovation Awards
