= Centro Universitário das Faculdades Metropolitanas Unidas =

Brazilian educational institution

University Center FMU
- Centro Universitário das Faculdades Metropolitanas Unidas
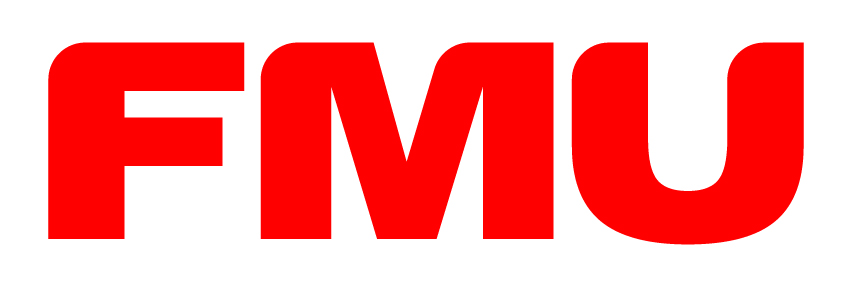
- Motto: Qualidade, Tradição e Inovação há mais de 40 anos
- Motto in English: Quality, Tradition and Innovation for more than 40 years
- Type: Private
- Established: 1968
- Rector: Labibi Elias Alves da Silva
- Students: 30,000
- Location: São Paulo, SP, Brazil
- Website: www.fmu.br

Centro Universitário das Faculdades Metropolitanas Unidas (English: United Metropolitan Colleges) is a Brazilian institution of higher education located in the city of São Paulo. The university is better known by the acronym FMU, which is maintained for the sake of tradition, since it has been popularly called FMU since its founding.

== History ==
The Faculdades Metropolitanas Unidas (FMU) was founded in 1968 by Professor Edevaldo Alves da Silva, Professor Onesimus Silveira, Professor Arnold Fioraranti, Professor Paulo Silveira and Arthur Ledo dos Santos. São Paulo.

FMU began operations on July 11, 1968. The same month, hundreds of students attended the first entrance exam. Initially six majors were offered: Law, Economics, Business, Accounting, Education and Social Work.

In 1975, FMU added the Faculdade de Filosofia, Ciências e Letras Santa Rita de Cássia (College of Arts and Sciences), and began offering Psychology, Pedagogy and Languages. In 1976, with the addition of the Faculdade de Educação e Ciências Nova Piratininga (College of Science and Education), Mathematics was added to the enrollment offerings.

In 1987, the institution established its graduate school, which is now known as Centro de Pesquisa e Pós-Graduação (CPPG) (Center for Research and Graduate Studies), which offers 96 master's degree courses, five MBA programs and twenty professional development courses. There is even a unique masters level course on Information Technology Law.

In 1989, FMU created one of its most traditional programs, Physical Education, which is considered one of the best majors in Brazil.

Also in the 1980s, FMU merged with two partner institutions. Faculdades Integradas Alcântara Machado (FIAM) offered a major in Social Communication (and currently offers majors in Journalism, Advertising, Radio and TV). Faculdades de Artes Alcântara Machado (FAAM) includes Faculdade de Música (College of Music), and is the only college in this region of Brazil to earn the highest score on both sections of Exame Nacional de Desempenho de Estudantes (Enade) (a college level standardized test) and its courses in Architecture, City Planning and Administration.

The FMU also partnered with Faculdades Integradas São Paulo (FISP), which currently offers courses in the field of Engineering.

Due to its expansion and following the Brazilian law, FMU changed its name to Centro Universitário (University Center) on March 23, 1999. Soon after, in 2000, it established the Instituto Metropolitano de Altos Estudos (IMAE) (Metropolitan Institution of Higher Education), which develops cross-disciplinary and interdisciplinary studies, focusing on contemporary issues in Brazil. The Institute publishes a Journal: Revista de Cultura IMAE (IMAE Journal of Culture).

As a University Center, the institution now offers many undergraduate majors and vocational degrees.

In one of its campuses, the University has a veterinary hospital, a veterinary medicine farm-school and various health care clinics.

In August 2013, the institution joined the international network of universities Laureate International Universities.

In December 2012, the Ministério da Educação (MEC) (Brazilian Ministry of Education) suspended entrance exams and new enrollment in FMU's Technology and Systems Analysis and Development program because of its poor performance in 2008 and in 2011 in the Conceito Preliminar de Curso (CPC). In 2013, after further review, the Ministry of Education suspended enrollment in several other programs for 2014.

== Faculdade de Direito (Law School) ==
FMU's Law School was founded in 1968. The law degree it provides is one of the most prestigious in the country. The Ministry of Education gave the program its highest rating. Many of the top lawyers in Brazil are FMU alumni, including Luiz Flávio Borges D’Urso, former president of the Order of Attorneys of Brazil.

=== Juizado Especial Cível (Small Claims Court)- FMU ===
In 1999 the Juizado Especial Cível (Small Claims Court) was created on FMU's Liberdade Campus, as a partnership between the São Paulo Court and FMU. This is the first such court created as part of a Law School in São Paulo. FMU maintains the operational structure required to conduct daily hearings and service to the community.

== Undergraduate Academic Offerings ==
- Campus Centro – College of Music
- Campus Itaim Bibi – Colleges of Economics, Accountancy, Business and Law
- Campus Liberdade – Colleges of Visual Arts, Law, International Relations and Engineering
- Campus Morumbi – Colleges of Social Communication, Journalism, Publicity, Radio and Television
- Campus Ponte Estaiada HOVET – Hospital Veterinário – College of Veterinary Medicine
- Campus Santo Amaro
- Campus Vergueiro
- Campus Vila Mariana
- Campus Vila Mariana II
- Campus Brigadeiro/Liberdade – Technology courses.

== Graduate Academic Offerings ==
- Master's degree in Architecture
- Master's degree in Law
- Master's degree in Management
- Master's degree in Administration & Gouvernance
- MBA in Auditing
- MBA in Management and Business Strategy
- MBA in Finances & Banking
- MBA in IT Management
- MBA in Fashion Design Management
- MBA in School Management
- Specialisation in higher education tutoring
- Specialisation in Biology
- Specialisation in Nursing
- Specialisation in Dentistry
- Specialisation in Physiotherapy
- Specialisation in Pharmacy
- Specialisation in Physical Education
- Specialisation in E-commerce
- Specialisation in Management
- Specialisation in Digital Games
- Specialisation in Journalism
- Specialisation in Marketing
