= Henry Staunton (businessman) =

British businessman (born 1948)

- Born: May 1948 (age 77)
- Occupation: Businessman
- Years active: 1960s–present
- Known for: Chairman, WH Smith

Henry Eric Staunton (born May 1948) is a British businessman, the former chairman of retailers WH Smith and BrightHouse, and of Post Office Limited. Earlier, he was finance director of Granada Group and then ITV plc.

Named in The Times 2006 Power 100 survey, and rated as one of the UK's top 50 finance movers and shakers by Accountancy Age, Staunton is an "experienced finance professional" and "well regarded dealmaker". While at Granada, he helped steer one of the largest mergers in media history – creating a unified ITV – and played a role in ensuring Granada and its executives came out on top after the £5.8bn deal to merge Carlton and Granada.

== Education and early career ==
Staunton was privately educated at Ipswich School before reading Economics and Statistics at the University of Exeter. In 1970, he joined auditing firm Price Waterhouse: he was admitted as a partner in 1981, later becoming Senior Audit Partner, looking after a number of its clients including news service Reuters and textiles and chemicals manufacturer Courtaulds.

== Later career ==
Staunton joined Granada plc, as finance director, in 1993 and, after the merger of Granada and Carlton, was appointed to the board of ITV plc on 3 December 2003. On 21 September 2005, ITV plc announced that Staunton planned to step down as Finance Director. He resigned from the Board of ITV plc on 29 March 2006, announcing that he planned to "broadly retire".

== Non-executive career ==
Staunton was chairman of Ashtead Group plc, a plant hire company (1997 to 2004), and was a non-executive director of EMAP plc, a consumer magazine and media company (1995 to 2002). In 2002, Staunton was forced to resign after a government ruling that he could not be on the board of both Granada and Emap. He has also been on the boards of ITN, a British news broadcaster, and BSkyB – the operator of the UK's largest digital pay television platform – and international fashion retailer New Look.

Staunton was appointed to the board of Legal & General on 1 May 2004 and was vice chairman and senior independent director until his retirement from the board in May 2013. He was also a non-executive director of Standard Bank from December 2005 to September 2016, of Ladbrokes from September 2006 to May 2010, and of The Merchants Trust plc from May 2008 to December 2014.

In 2010, it was announced Staunton was to join the non-executive boards of WH Smith plc and Capital & Counties Properties. He was appointed chairman of BrightHouse, a rent-to-own retailer, in July 2014. He retired from WH Smith in June 2022 and from Capital & Counties Properties in March 2023.

Staunton was appointed chair of Post Office Limited in December 2022. He was removed on 27 January 2024, following disagreements with the Business Secretary Kemi Badenoch on matters including the appointment of a new independent director. This action came as the government sought to strengthen governance at the state-owned company in the wake of the long-running Horizon IT scandal. The following month, in an interview with The Sunday Times, Staunton said he had been asked by a senior civil service official shortly after his appointment to slow the payout of payments to sub-postmasters affected by the scandal so that the government could "limp into the next election". The next day, Badenoch told Parliament that Staunton had been under "formal investigation" for misconduct.

== Other interests ==
Outside his business life, Staunton sits on the advisory board of the University of Exeter Business School. He plays Eton Fives and golf. His clubs include Walton Heath Golf Club and the RAC.
