= Ian Roderick Macneil =

The Baron of Barra
- Born: 20 June 1929
- Died: 16 February 2010 (aged 80)
- Education: Harvard Law School (BA); University of Vermont (LLB)
- Scientific career
- Fields: Legal scholar
- Institutions: Northwestern University

Ian Roderick Macneil of Barra, 26th Baron (20 June 1929 – 16 February 2010), The Macneil of Barra, Chief of Clan MacNeil, also known as Clan Niall was a Scottish American legal scholar.

== Early life and education ==
Macneil was the son of Robert Lister Macneil. He was educated at the University of Vermont, USA (BA, 1950, majoring in Sociology) and Harvard (LL.B., 1955) where he studied contracts under the noted theorist Lon L. Fuller. He was a Fellow of the American Academy of Arts and Sciences. He served as an infantry Lieutenant in the US Army from 1951 to 1953 and remained in the reserve until 1969, when he was honourably discharged with the rank of Major. He married Nancy (née Wilson) and they had three sons (one deceased) and a daughter.

== Macneil as Clan Chief ==
According to clan tradition, Ian Macneil, having succeeded his father, Robert Lister Macneil of Barra in 1970, was the 46th Chief of the Clan, in line of descent from Niall of the Nine Hostages, High King of Ireland, and 26th Macneil of Barra. Notable events during his tenure included his gifting of the crofting estate of Barra to the Scottish nation, and his granting of a lease of the medieval Kisimul Castle to Historic Scotland for 1000 years at an annual rent of £1 and one bottle of whisky. On his death he was succeeded in the position of Chief by his son Roderick Wilson Macneil.

== Scholarship ==
Macneil was a scholar in the field of contract law and is particularly associated (along with Stewart Macaulay) with the invention of "Relational Contract Theory". This theory had its first outing at the Association of American Law Professors' annual conference in late 1967 and was first alluded to in print in Macneil's article "Whither Contracts?" in 1969. However, the first really substantial articles laying down the foundations of the theory appeared in 1974. "Restatement (Second) of Contracts and Presentiation" and "The Many Futures of Contracts". He developed the theory further in "Contracts: Adjustment of Long-Term Economic Relations Under Classical, Neoclassical, and Relational Contract Law", and in his monograph The New Social Contract. He wrote more on relational contracts after 1980, mainly concerned with explaining and defending the theory, which has been much misunderstood by academic commentators, whether critical of or in favour of relational theory, but the outlines and much of the detail of the theory were settled by 1980.

In 2000, Macneil renamed his theory "essential contract theory" to distinguish it from other possible versions of relational contract Further interesting explanation has been given by Macneil in "Reflections on Relational Contract Theory after a Neo-classical Seminar".

Macneil was also responsible, with Speidel and Stipanowich for a magisterial five-volume treatise on US arbitration law, Federal Arbitration Law: Agreements, Awards, and Remedies under the Federal Arbitration Act(Little, Brown: Boston, 1994), which in 1995 won the American Association of Publishers' Best New Legal Book award, as well as a monograph on arbitration.

=== Essential Contract Theory ===
Macneil's theory posits that the traditional approach of doctrinal contract law in the common law countries, which he calls "classical" and "neoclassical", which concentrates on "the deal" at its time of making, and treats individual contracts as discrete entities, is an inadequate and inaccurate tool for the study of contracts. He argues that all contracts are in fact not discrete at all but belong in the context of complex webs of exchange relations. This theory can be seen as a counter to both the "death of contract" idea, that contract as a separate idea was no longer relevant and that breach of contract is best regarded just as another tort (civil wrong), most closely associated with Grant Gilmore, and to Legal formalism in contract, in which the approach is to ignore, to a large extent, contextual matters surrounding the contract and concentrate only on the express terms and a strictly limited range of implied terms (though Robert E. Scott has argued that a formalist approach can still work within the context of an acceptance of a relational view of contract). Contract relations fall along a spectrum from the highly relational (e.g., long-term employment contracts) to the "as if discrete", largely transactionalised relation (e.g., spot purchases of commodities). All relations, though, are connected with and belong within a broader social context, with which successful relations must be harmonised. It is possible to draw axes through many facets of contractual relations, indicating the likely features of such facets in relations falling at different points along the spectrum.

What is particularly distinctive about his approach is his postulation of a number of "norms in a positivist sense", of which 10 common contract norms apply to all contracts: (i) role integrity; (ii) reciprocity (or 'mutuality'); (iii) implementation of planning; (iv) effectuation of consent; (v) flexibility; (vi) contractual solidarity; (vii) the 'linking norms' (restitution, reliance and expectation interests); (viii) the power norm (creation and restraint of power); (ix) propriety of means; and (x) harmonisation with the social matrix. By "norms in a positivist sense" Macneil means that they are norms-in-fact, that is to say that they are observable in operation, to distinguish them from norms in the sense of normative as opposed to positive economics. The extent to which a particular exchange relation is in harmony with the norms is likely to influence the success of the relation in terms of its longevity (where appropriate) and the ability of the parties to gain the full range of benefits that the exchange can potentially offer. The extent to which the actual doctrinal law harmonises with these norms can arguably determine the usefulness of legal tools and interventions in exchange relations, but it is a complicated question.

== Reception ==
A symposium on relational contract theory was held at Northwestern University in 1999, with papers given by a number of American contract scholars including Stewart Macaulay, Melvin Eisenberg, Jay Feinman, Eric Posner, Robert E. Scott, and Richard Speidel.

Macneil's work is often considered inaccessible and difficult to read. And Macneil expressed some disappointment at the reception of the work among legal scholars: 'I have now had over a decade to accept that there had never been any race to a relational theory of contract, nor have the succeeding years seen either widespread acceptance of (or indeed much challenge to) my particular theory or the development of other relational theories.' However, the Northwestern symposium and other more recent work goes some way to correcting that omission. In particular, David Campbell has published an edited collection of Macneil's relational contract theory work. Macneil's work in particular has also been discussed by Richard Austen-Baker, who relates Macneil's system of norms to English contract law doctrine, and used Macneil's theory to discuss the need or otherwise of further regulation of consumer contracts.

== Death ==
Macneil died 16 February 2010, at the age of 80.

Baronage of Scotland
Preceded by Robert Lister Macneil, 25th Baron	Baron of Barra; 1970-2010	Succeeded by Roderick "Rory" MacNeil, 27th Baron

Preceded by Robert Lister MacNeil	Chiefs of Clan MacNeil; 1970–2010	Succeeded by Roderick "Rory" Wilson Macneil
