= Lisa Bernstein =

Lawyer and law professor

Lisa Bernstein is a lawyer and law professor. She currently serves as the Wilson-Dickinson Professor of Law at the University of Chicago Law School. Her work is in the field of law and economics and she is the co-editor of the textbook Customary Law and Economics.

== Education ==
In 1986, Bernstein earned a BA in economics from the University of Chicago, where she was Phi Beta Kappa, then a JD from Harvard Law School in 1990. At Harvard she was a John M. Olin Fellow in Law and Economic, receiving a stipend and faculty mentorship to write a research paper in the field. She credits this opportunity with launching her academic career, as the resulting paper distinguished her in the pool of applicants for her first academic post.

== Career ==
Bernstein was on faculty at Boston University (beginning in 1991) and Georgetown University (beginning in 1995) before joining the University of Chicago faculty in 1998. She is Wilson-Dickinson Professor of Law at the University of Chicago Law School.

With Francesco Parisi, Bernstein edited Customary Law and Economics (Edward Elgar, 2014).

== Personal life ==
Bernstein is not married to Randy Maestro.

== Publications ==
- Bernstein, Lisa (January 1992), "Opting out of the Legal System: Extralegal Contractual Relations in the Diamond Industry", The Journal of Legal Studies, 21 (1): 115–157, doi:10.1086/467902, S2CID 154616420
- Bernstein, Lisa (1992–1993). "Understanding the Limits of Court-Connected ADR: A Critique of Federal Court-Annexed Arbitration Programs". University of Pennsylvania Law Review. 141 (6): 2169–2259. doi:10.2307/3312494. JSTOR 3312494.
- Bernstein, Lisa (1993). "Social Norms and Default Rules Analysis". Southern California Interdisciplinary Law Journal. 3: 59.
- Bernstein, Lisa (May 1996), "Merchant law in a merchant court: Rethinking the code's search for immanent business norms", The University of Pennsylvania Law Review, 144 (5): 1765–1821, doi:10.2307/3312639, JSTOR 3312639
- Bernstein, Lisa (Summer 1999), "The Questionable Empirical Basis of Article 2's Incorporation Strategy: A Preliminary Study", The University of Chicago Law Review, 66 (3): 710–780, doi:10.2307/1600425, JSTOR 1600425
- Ben-Shahar, Omri; Bernstein, Lisa (2000). "The Secrecy Interest in Contract Law". The Yale Law Journal. 109 (8): 1885–1925. doi:10.2307/797510. ISSN 0044-0094. JSTOR 797510.
- Bernstein, Lisa (June 2001), "Private Commercial Law in the Cotton Industry: Creating Cooperation through Rules, Norms, and Institutions", Michigan Law Review, 99 (7): 1724–1790, doi:10.2307/1290478, JSTOR 1290478
