= Kate Vitasek =

American author and educator (born 1968)

Kate Vitasek (born September 19, 1968) is an American author and educator. She is a faculty member for Graduate and Executive Education at the University of Tennessee Haslam College of Business Her research focuses on the Vested outsourcing business model, sourcing business model theory, the relational contract, and collaborative win-win business relationships.

== Career ==
Before joining University of Tennessee, she worked for P&G, Microsoft, Accenture, Stream International, and Modus Media Modus Media International.

At University of Tennessee, Vitasek researches business models. In 2010, Vitasek and two researchers codified their findings on the Vested business model into a methodology to enable organizations to create highly collaborative relationships. Vitasek's work on the Vested business model led to what is known to as Sourcing Business Model theory. Many of Vitasek's books are about the Vested outsourcing collaborative win-win relationships. Vitasek has also done research for the U.S. Air Force on issues relating to contracting logistics and transportation.

Vitasek's recent research has focused on relational contracting. In 2021 she published (with David Frydlinger, Jim Bergman, and Tim Cummins) Contracting in the New Economy: Using Relational Contracts to Boost Trust and Collaboration in Strategic Business Relationships which argues for adopting formal relational contracts as the standard for contracting activity. The Nobel laureate Oliver Hart's Foreword in the book notes, “…for a long time I have felt that the traditional approach to contracts, where lawyers try to think of all the possible things that can go wrong in a relationship and include contractual provisions to deal with them, is broken.” Hart added that it “never worked that well, and in an increasingly complex and uncertain world it works even worse.”

In 2019, Vitasek Frydlinger and Hart collaborated on a Harvard Business Review article, "A New Approach to Contracts: How to Build Better long-term strategic partnerships". The authors assert that "a formal relational contract lays a foundation of trust, specifies mutual goals, and establishes governance structures to keep the parties’ expectations and interests aligned over time."

=== Reviews of works ===
Vested Outsourcing (2010) describes how to outsource business processes or services. The book identifies potential issues in outsourcing and how companies can best work together for a good outsourcing relationship. Hollye Moss, professor at the Western Carolina University, wrote that the book "takes a new approach to the relationship, creating a win-win scenario. It is well-written, easy to read, and thought-provoking." Booklist wrote that Vested: How P&G, McDonald's and Microsoft are Redefining Winning in Business Relationships (2012) was a "lively presentation" by the authors and that it "should appeal to businesspeople willing to take a chance on trust and transparency to produce transformative results."

== Books ==
- Vitasek, Kate; et al. (2011). The Vested Outsourcing Manual (1st ed.). New York: Palgrave Macmillan. ISBN 978-0230112681.
- Vitasek, Kate; et al. (2012). Vested: How P&G, McDonald's, and Microsoft are Redefining Winning in Business Relationships (1st ed.). New York: Palgrave Macmillan. ISBN 978-0230341708.
- Vitasek, Kate; et al. (2012). The Vested Way: How a "What's in it for We" Mindset Revolutionizes Business Relationships (1st ed.). New York: Palgrave Macmillan. ISBN 978-0230342101.
- Vitasek, Kate; Ledyard, Mike (2013). Vested Outsourcing, Second Edition: Five Rules That Will Transform Outsourcing (2nd ed.). New York: Palgrave Macmillan. ISBN 978-1137297198.
- Vitasek, Kate; et al. (2013). Getting to We: Negotiating Agreements for Highly Collaborative Relationships (1st ed.). New York: Palgrave Macmillan. ISBN 978-1137297181.
- Keith, Bonnie; et al. (2016). Strategic Sourcing in the New Economy: Harnessing the Potential of Sourcing Business Models for Modern Procurement (1st ed.). New York: Palgrave Macmillan. ISBN 978-1137552181.
- Frydlinger, David; Vitasek, Kate; Bergman, Jim; Cummins, Tim (2021). Contracting in the New Economy: Using Relational Contracts to Boost Trust and Collaboration in Strategic Business Relationships (1st ed.). New York: Palgrave Macmillan. ISBN 978-3030650988.
- Vitasek, Kate; Groton, James P.; Waldman, Ellen; Waxman, Allen (2024). Preventing the Dispute Before It Begins: Proven Mechanisms for Fostering Better Business Relationships. ISBN 978-1639055555.
