= PayPoint =

British business for multichannel payments and retail services

PayPoint plc
- Type: Public limited company
- Traded as: LSE: PAY
- Industry: Payment systems
- Founded: 1996
- Headquarters: Welwyn Garden City, England
- Number of locations: 16,098 retail networks (2020)
- Key people: Giles Kerr (Chairman); Nick Wiles (CEO)
- Revenue: ▲£337.0 million (2026)
- Operating income: ▲£76.9 million (2026)
- Net income: ▲£41.2 million (2026)
- Website: www.paypoint.com

PayPoint plc is a British company that provides multichannel payment and retail services across the United Kingdom. Founded in 1996, the company facilitates payments through a nationwide network of convenience stores and offers services including bill payment, mobile phone top-ups, parcel delivery and collection, and Open Banking integrations.

Paypoint is publicly listed on the London Stock Exchange.

== History ==
The PayPoint network was set up in 1996 with the aim of enabling customers to load gas and electricity onto their pre-paid energy meters in cash at their local convenience store. Prepayment meters are intended to help customers to manage energy use, thereby helping the environment, and control their spending, thereby enabling to live within their limited means. Typically about 40% of customers use prepayment meters for their electricity and gas: this percentage has remained roughly constant over the last five years. First tested in Northern Ireland, the system was expanded to London in 1997 and in 1998, British Gas prepayment meter customers were able to charge their Quantum smart cards at PayPoint retailers.

Following continued growth and public listing, in 2006, the company became the exclusive cash payment network for the BBC's TV Licence fee. In November 2006 and February 2007, PayPoint acquired online payment service providers Metacharge and SECPay respectively. In September 2010, PayPoint completed the acquisition of Verrus, a pay-by-phone parking payment provider and re-branded in North America and Europe under the brand name, PayByPhone. In May 2014, PayPoint.net and PayByPhone were merged under a single identity, PayPoint Mobile and Online.

In March 2024, PayPoint partnered with Lloyds Bank. It was announced that Lloyds Bank would be the main card acquiring partner for PayPoint.

== Services and operations ==
The PayPoint branding in use on most stores

=== Payment services ===
PayPoint provides multi-channel payment solutions across the United Kingdom, including Open Banking, direct debit, card, and cash based transactions. Its services are widely used for utility bill payments, mobile top-ups, and public transport ticketing, through a network of more than 28,000 retail outlets.

In most cases, the service fees are paid by the payee organizations rather than the customer. A notable exception is cash deposits to Monzo bank accounts, where a £1 fee is deducted from the deposited amount.

=== Parcel services (Collect+) ===
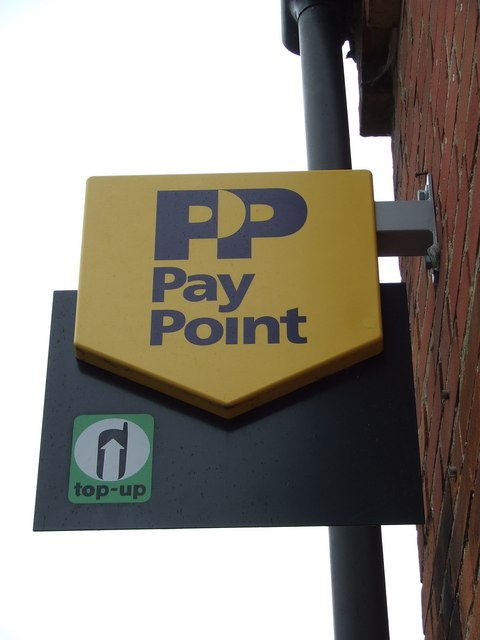
A PayPoint sign at a shop in Norfolk

In February 2011, Collect+ a parcel sending and collection service, was launched as a joint venture between PayPoint and Yodel. This service is available through 14,000 of the PayPoint retail network in the United Kingdom and allows customers to collect and send packages at their local convenience store.

On 6 April 2020, PayPoint announced an agreement with Yodel to take full ownership of Collect+.

In February 2024, PayPoint partnered with Royal Mail and its Collect+ service.

=== International operations ===
PayPoint established PayPoint Ireland Limited in 2003 to operate a retail payment network in the Republic of Ireland.

In May 2007, the company entered the Romanian market through the acquisition of the local payment network Paystore from RTC Group.

In October 2017, PayPoint expanded its presence in Romania by acquiring the local operations of Payzone.

In October 2018, PayPoint withdrew from the Republic of Ireland and ceased all retail terminal services in the country.

In October 2020, PayPoint signed an agreement to sell its Romanian subsidiary to the private equity firm Innova Capital. The transaction was completed in April 2021.
