= TeamSport Go Karting =

Chain of go-kart centers in the United Kingdom

- Company type: Private
- Industry: Motorsport
- Founded: 1992
- Headquarters: Farnham, Surrey, United Kingdom
- Number of locations: 37
- Area served: Basildon, Birmingham, Bournemouth, Brighton, Bristol, Bradford, Cardiff, Crawley, Dunstable, Farnborough, Gosport, Harlow, High Wycombe, Hull, Leeds, Liverpool, London (6), Newcastle, Nottingham, Reading, Southampton, Stockton, Warrington, Manchester (2), Sheffield, Stoke-on-Trent, Preston, Coventry
- Key people: Bic (CEO, chairman & president)
- Services: Indoor go kart racing
- Website: www.team-sport.co.uk

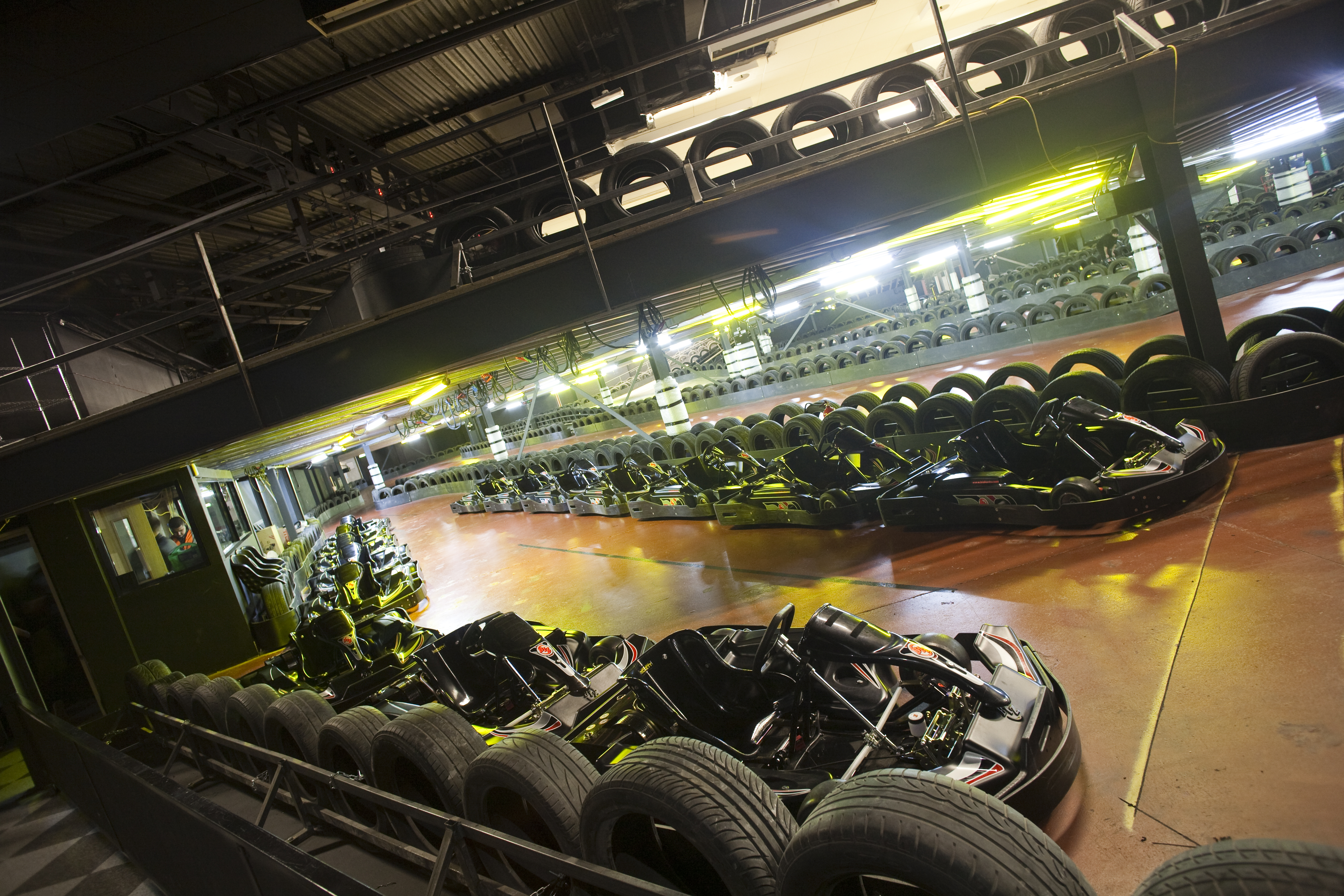
TeamSport's Tower Bridge eco-track

TeamSport is an indoor go karting company operating racing circuits across the United Kingdom. It was founded in 1992, opening its first track in Guildford, and is now the UK's largest indoor go karting company.

As of present, TeamSport operates 38 tracks in the UK, and some in Europe. The majority of its tracks feature lithium battery-powered electric karts, while others feature conventional 200cc petrol karts, each capable of reaching speeds of up to 45mph. TeamSport plans to fully upgrade all of its circuits to feature electric karts by the end of the decade.

In October 2017, TeamSport was acquired by Duke Street Capital, a British private equity firm.

== Locations ==
=== UK ===
TeamSport has 38 tracks located throughout the United Kingdom, including six in London (Edmonton, London Docklands, Mitcham, Acton, Watford and a venue at Brent Cross Shopping Centre), two tracks in Manchester (Trafford and Victoria), as well as in Basildon, Birmingham, Brighton, Bristol, Bournemouth, Cardiff, Crawley, Dunstable, Farnborough, Gosport, Harlow, High Wycombe, Leeds, Liverpool, Newcastle, Nottingham, Preston, Reading, Southampton, Warrington, Coventry, Stoke-on-Trent, Sheffield and Bergkirchen Bavaria, Germany.

TeamSport's portfolio of racing tracks ranges between 375 and 1,000 metres in length, and offers features including tunnels, multiple levels, and chicanes.

In 2011, TeamSport opened London's first 'eco track' at Tower Bridge, using lithium battery-powered eco-karts capable of reaching speeds of up to 40 mph.. The circuit closed in 2018, being replaced by the current London Docklands track.

TeamSport's circuits have attracted a number of famous motorsport drivers over the years, including Formula One World Championship winner John Surtees, former Force India driver Adrian Sutil, as well as Mark Webber and Damon Hill.

TeamSport Warrington is currently the largest purpose-built indoor go karting track in the UK.

=== Outside of UK ===
In 2023, TeamSport announced they would open their first location outside of the UK, located at The Wall in Utrecht, Netherlands.
