= Companhia Brasileira de Material Ferroviário =

Railway manufacturing company

Companhia Brasileira de Material Ferroviário S/A - COBRASMA
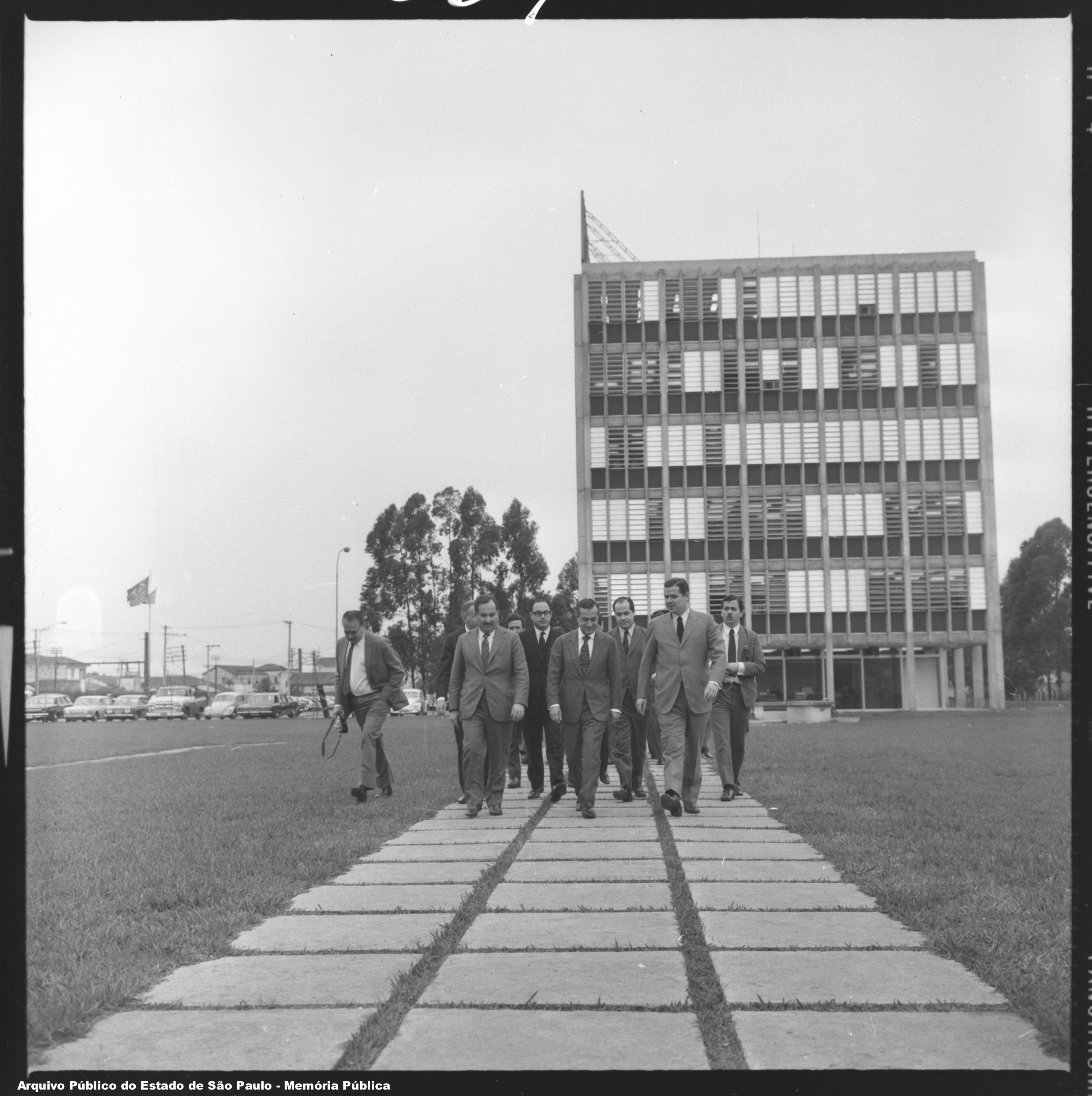
- Governor Laudo Natel, together with Secretaries Paulo Maluf, of Transportation, Henry Aydar, of the Civil House, and the presidents of Estrada de Ferro Sorocabana and Companhia Mogiana de Estradas de Ferro, examine the bulk wagons at Cobrasma, Osasco, to transport the corn, soybean and other bulk crops.
- Type: S.A. (corporation)
- Genre: Metallurgy/Steel
- Founded: September 1, 1944; 81 years ago
- Founder: Gastão Vidigal
- Defunct: May 1998; 28 years ago
- Headquarters: Osasco
- Key people: President: Luís Eulálio de Bueno Vidigal Filho
- Products: Auto parts, equipment and parts for the railway, nuclear, petrochemical, steel and road vehicle industries
- Revenue: R$ 19,313,000.00 (1997)
- Operating income: R$ 143,156,000.00 (1997)
- Net income: R$ 156.258.000,00 (1997)
- Number of employees: 52 (1998)
- Subsidiaries: Forjas Nacionais S.A. (Fornasa); Braseixos Rockwell S.A. (associação com Rockwell International); Brasprensas Rockwell S.A (associação com Rockwell International)

The Companhia Brasileira de Material Ferroviário (COBRASMA) (B3: CBMA3, CBMA4) was a private company (Grupo Vidigal) responsible for manufacturing part of Brazil's railway equipment. At its peak, it employed nearly 6,900 people and had annual sales exceeding 200 million dollars. After a severe crisis, it ceased its manufacturing activities in May 1998, with a debt of approximately R$600 million.

== History ==
During World War II, Brazilian railroads faced shortages of parts and supplies for maintenance, which were typically imported from the countries involved in the conflict. These countries, however, were redirecting their industries to support the war effort. In 1941, the state of São Paulo had a railway network spanning 7,388 kilometers, with 2,162 locomotives, 3,934 freight wagons, and 2,319 passenger cars.

As the war progressed, the risk of the rail network collapsing due to the lack of parts increased. In 1942, the US government sent a technical mission to Brazil, led by Morris Llewellyn Cooke (1872–1960), to study and encourage Brazilian industry to produce goods that the country typically imported. This initiative aimed to involve US companies in providing projects and services to help strengthen local production capabilities for the war effort.

Encouraged by the Cooke Mission, a group of industrialists led by Gastão Vidigal came together in 1943 and formed the Companhia Brasileira de Material Ferroviário (Cobrasma) on September 1, 1944. Due to its shareholder structure, the new company absorbed the land and facilities of the Companhia Paulista de Material Ferroviário (Comaf), located in the then-district of Osasco, which had been bankrupt for many years.

Shareholder	Percentage
Companhia Paulista de Estradas de Ferro	25%
Companhia Mogiana de Estradas de Ferro	25%
Companhia Siderúrgica Belgo-Mineira	12,5%
Grupo Monteiro Aranha	7,5%
Hime Comércio e Indústria S.A.	3,25%
Klabin Irmãos e Cia.	2,75%
Companhia Central De Administração e Participações	2,5%
Construtora de Imóveis S/A-Casa Bancária	2,25%
Votorantim S.A.	1,37%
Siderúrgica Barra Mansa	1,37%
Indústrias Reunidas Fábricas Matarazzo	1,37%
Companhia Itaquerê, Industrial, Agrícola e Imobiliária	1,37%
Companhia Mecânica e Importadora de São Paulo	0,75%
Companhia Siderúrgica Nacional	0,62%
Estrada de Ferro Sorocabana (EFS)	0,5%
Companhia Estrada de Ferro do Dourado	0,5%
General Electric	0,5%
Other shareholders	10,9%
Total	100%

In 1987, the company caused significant losses to investors by issuing shares worth 108.1 million reais on the market, supported by unrealistic profit projections. This led to losses for the three coordinating banks (Bradesco, Crefisul, and Banco de Crédito Nacional), 124 financial institutions, and thousands of small and medium-sized investors. The lawsuit that followed sparked controversy when it was dismissed by Judge João Carlos da Rocha Mattos in 1999.

In 1998, after several bankruptcy filings, the company ceased its operations.

== Products ==
=== Railroads products ===
==== Freight wagons ====
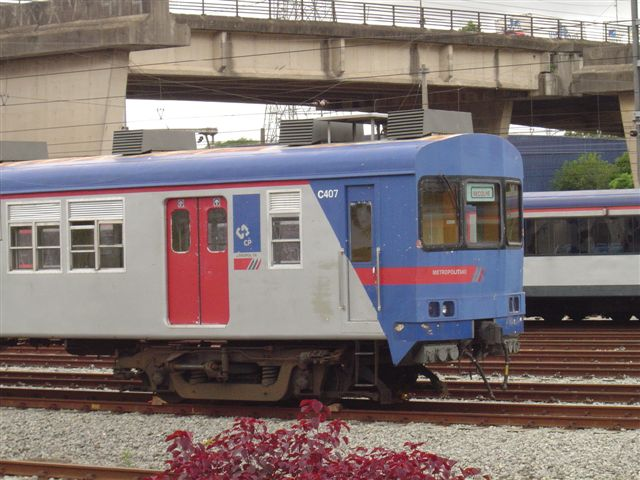
TUE 400 Series manufactured by Cobrasma in conjunction with FNV.

Cobrasma began production in June 1946, assembling freight cars built in the United States by the Pressed Steel Car Company for the Estrada de Ferro Noroeste do Brasil (NOB). Its first locally manufactured wagons were produced in 1948. Until 1992, when it stopped producing freight cars of various types, Cobrasma manufactured a total of 14,879 cars at its factories in Osasco and Sumaré/Hortolândia (from 1979):

Year	Quantity	Year	Quantity	Year	Quantity
1948	27	1963	375	1978	1252
1949	0	1964	134	1979	125
1950	144	1965	160	1980	346
1951	291	1966	150	1981	212
1952	268	1967	179	1982	318
1953	234	1968	60	1983	450
1954	363	1969	465	1984	196
1955	573	1970	147	1985	406
1956	452	1971	258	1986	435
1957	324	1972	451	1987	36
1958	433	1973	1043	1988	349
1959	25	1974	933	1989	0
1960	80	1975	1472	1990	50
1961	66	1976	1038	1991	0
1962	50	1977	360	1992	314
Total			14879		

==== Passenger wagons ====
Unlike the freight wagons, which were manufactured from the start of its operations, Cobrasma only began building passenger cars in 1957 when it partnered with FNV and Santa Matilde to produce the EFCB's 200 Series carbon steel trailer cars. To maintain production for a longer period, Cobrasma attempted to compete to supply 90 cars to the Santos - Jundiaí Railroad. However, the proposal was not even submitted because Rede Ferroviária Federal (the parent company of Santos Jundiaí) required the cars to be made of stainless steel. At that time, only Mafersa had mastered the manufacturing process, making it the only company qualified to compete. Later, Cobrasma, FNV, and Santa Matilde accused the president of RFFSA (who was both a shareholder and director of Mafersa) of directing the competition toward Mafersa, leading to the Mafersa case, which ended inconclusively.

Cobrasma resumed manufacturing passenger cars in 1965 when it partnered again with FNV and Santa Matilde to produce 300 of the EFCB's 400 Series cars. It was not until 1975, when it partnered with the French group Francorail and acquired a license to produce stainless steel cars, that Cobrasma began manufacturing passenger cars more regularly. This continued until 1987 when the last stainless steel car was delivered to the Belo Horizonte metro.

Car manufacturing ended in 1991, with the completion of the last six tram cars. Although Cobrasma produced cars for unit trains, it never manufactured passenger cars for long-distance trains, a market dominated by Mafersa, FNV, and Santa Matilde.

Year	Quantity	Year	Quantity
1957	6	1982	88
1959	30	1983	78
1965	9	1984	38
1966	39	1985	60
1967	51	1986	48
1979	144	1987	12
1980	104	1990	2
1981	106	1991	6
Total		821	

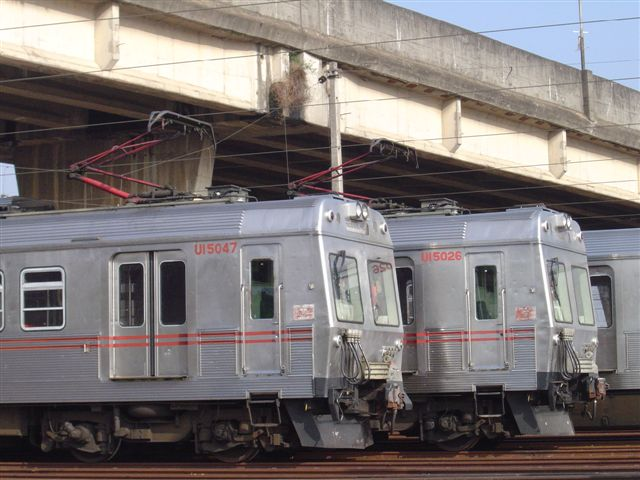
TUE Série 5000 (originally FEPASA's 9000 series) was manufactured by Cobrasma-Osasco between 1978 and 1980.

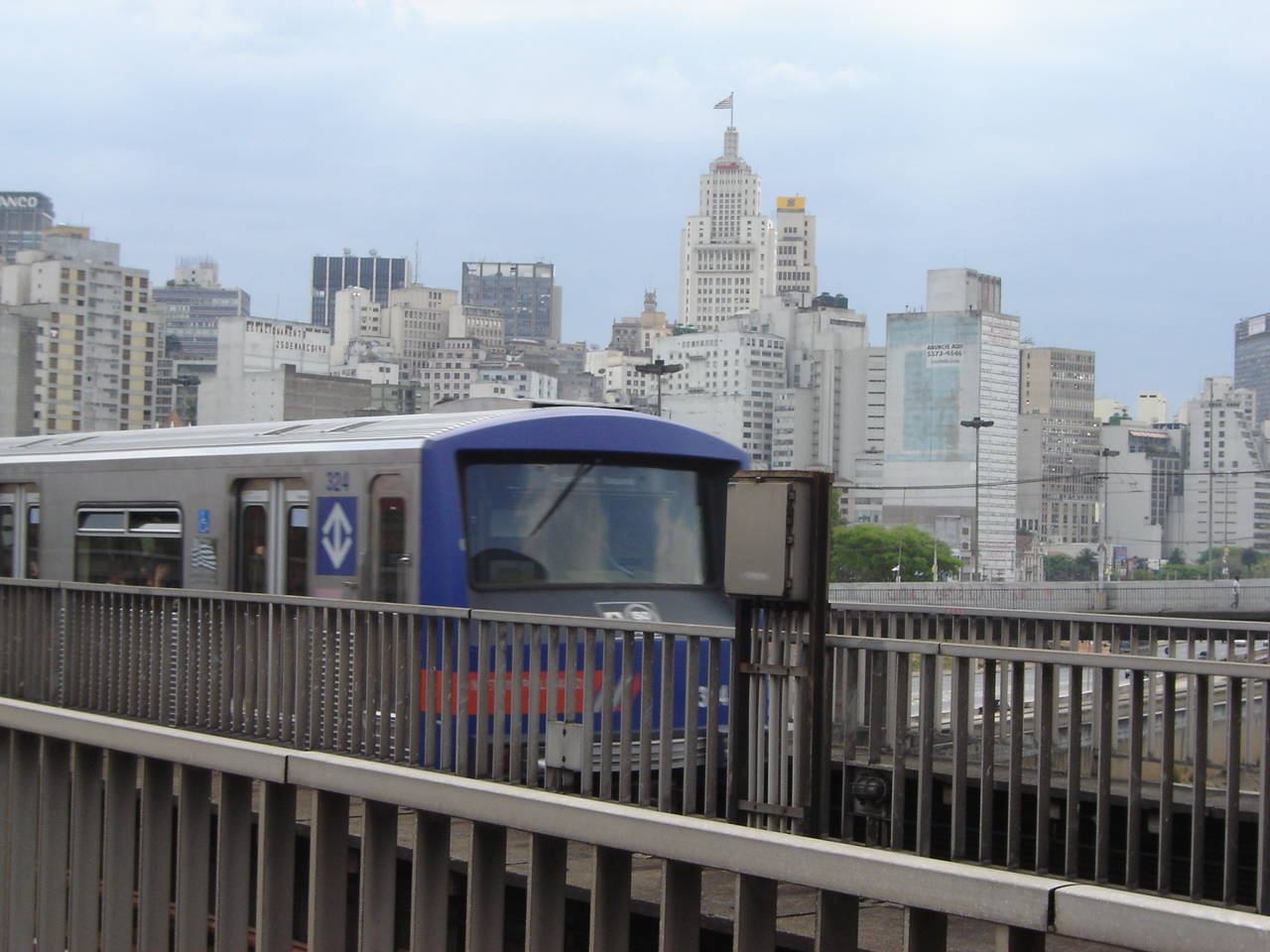
The trains on red line 3- were manufactured by Cobrasma's two factories in Osasco and Sumaré.

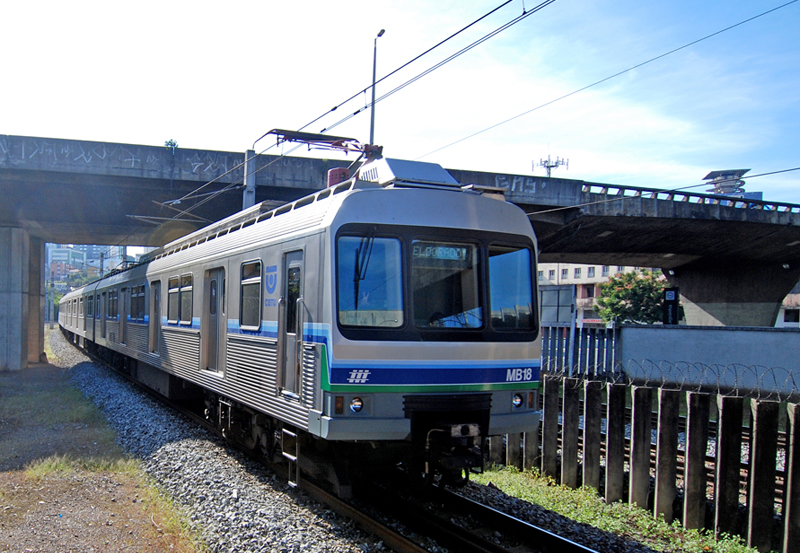
900 Series train of the Belo Horizonte Metro, manufactured by Cobrasma in partnership with Francorail/MTE.

==== Buses ====
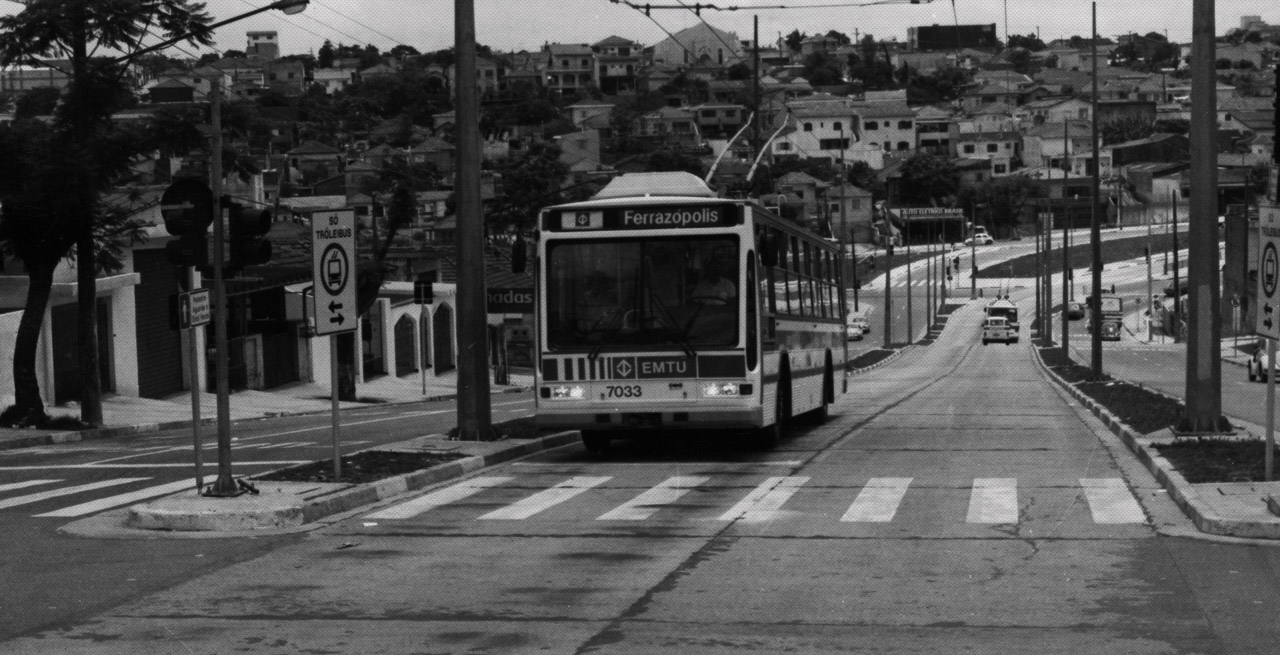
One of the 46 trolleybuses manufactured by Cobrasma for the Metro running on the recently inaugurated São Mateus-Jabaquara Metropolitan Corridor, 1988.

During the 1980s, economic crises, culminating in the Década Perdida, led to a decline in orders for railway equipment. In an attempt to diversify its production, Cobrasma began building stainless steel buses and trolleybuses.

Between 1983 and 1986, the company hired the design office Grupo Associado de Pesquisa e Planejamento Ltda (GAPP). The GAPP team, which included designer João Gomes Filho, developed the Trinox road model. Although the project was successful, manufacturing faced challenges due to Cobrasma's lack of expertise in producing road vehicles. This resulted in manufacturing defects and reliability issues, a decline in bus sales, and the high cost of the Trinox, which used stainless steel in its structure. The company later launched other models such as the CX-201, 202, 301, and 302. Between 1987 and 1989, Cobrasma manufactured 428 road buses, mostly the CX-201 model.

Trolleybus production was limited, with 46 vehicles sold to Companhia do Metropolitano de São Paulo and 2 to Companhia Trólebus Araraquara, manufactured between 1987 and 1989. In 1986, São Paulo City Hall, through CMTC, announced a project to acquire articulated trolleybuses. Cobrasma partnered with Mafersa for this project, but it was eventually canceled.

In 1990, the company ceased bus production due to its lack of economic viability, having built a total of 476 vehicles. At the peak of its production, Cobrasma held only 5% of the bus manufacturing market. The investment in the bus market worsened the company's financial situation.

Year	Road	Trolleybuses
1987	101	N/D
1988	159	13
1989	168	8
1990	N/D	27
Total	428	48

==== Foundry ====
Unlike other companies in the market, which purchased parts from existing foundries, Cobrasma was designed to have its foundry from the beginning. Designed by American Steel Foundries, Cobrasma's steel and iron foundry was the largest in Latin America at the time. It began operations in 1948 and produced parts for both the domestic and export markets continuously until it closed in October 1994. Its production increased in the 1950s when the federal government encouraged the establishment of the automobile industry in the country. Production dropped in 1968 during the company's major strike, but it reached its peak in the aftermath of the Brazilian Miracle.

Year	Quantity	Year	Quantity	Year	Quantity
1948	1385	1964	11440	1980	27407
1949	5411	1965	11343	1981	18082
1950	5845	1966	11917	1982	12935
1951	5819	1967	10189	1983	8461
1952	7649	1968	9217	1984	14972
1953	5749	1969	11971	1985	21556
1954	9827	1970	14016	1986	25176
1955	8873	1971	13811	1987	16114
1956	10479	1972	13434	1988	14123
1957	11194	1973	23080	1989	15153
1958	9894	1974	27687	1990	13639
1959	8802	1975	26948	1991	10504
1960	11263	1976	29068	1992	10818
1961	11243	1977	22058	1993	10387
1962	11684	1978	20669	1994	7400
1963	12290	1979	23114		
Total			644096		

== Trade union movement ==
In 1962, the workers established the Cobrasma Factory Commission to represent the more than 2,500 employees at the company. However, the commission was not officially recognized by the Vidigal family, which controlled the factory. Until then, the workers had been represented by the São Paulo Metalworkers' Union, but workers from Cobrasma and other companies in the region decided to organize independently. In 1963, they founded the Osasco and Region Metalworkers' Union. In November of that year, the first major strike at Cobrasma took place, demanding better wages and working conditions.

Following the 1964 coup d'état, the military regime dismissed and arrested the union leaders in Osasco. At the same time, the military sought to place more compliant or regime-supporting leaders in charge of the union. In 1967, workers overwhelmingly supported the opposition slate, led by young Cobrasma worker José Ibrahim, who was elected union president. Ibrahim was a leader of the radical left-wing trade union movement, which brought the union and Cobrasma into conflict with the repressive government agencies.

On July 16, 1968, a young Cobrasma worker died in a fire at the company's forge, an accident caused by poor working conditions. This tragedy led to a factory-wide halt and became the catalyst for a strike. Ibrahim led the strike, demanding:

- A 35% wage increase
- Recognition of the factory committees
- Job security for committee members
- Individual and collective protective equipment
- An end to the wage squeeze

In response, Cobrasma's owners called on the authorities to suppress the strike and arrest its leaders. Ibrahim and his colleagues expanded the strike to other companies in Osasco, growing the movement and making it harder for the regime to control. As an extreme measure, soldiers from the Quitaúna garrison were deployed to break the strike at the companies. Around a hundred Cobrasma workers barricaded themselves inside the factory, resisting the soldiers. When the soldiers attempted to enter the factory in the early hours of July 17, they suffered several casualties. Workers scattered steel chips in the courtyard, injuring the horses' legs, and causing them to fall and unseat their riders. Inside the factory, workers destroyed the lighting system, making it difficult for soldiers to navigate around machines, parts, and chemicals, leading to further injuries. By the morning of July 17, the factory was retaken, and most of the workers were arrested, including Ibrahim and the French priest Pierre Wauthier. Despite this, the strike continued for another week.

== See also ==
- Mafersa
- RFFSA
