= Duke Street Capital =

British company

- Type: Private
- Industry: Private equity
- Founded: 1988; 38 years ago
- Headquarters: London, W1; United Kingdom
- Products: Leveraged buyout, Growth capital
- Total assets: £2.6 billion
- Number of employees: 45+
- Website: www.dukestreet.com

Duke Street Capital is a private equity firm focused on leveraged buyout and growth capital investments in middle-market companies in Western Europe, particularly the UK and France. Duke Street invests across four sectors: consumer, healthcare, industrials/engineering, and services. It focuses on companies with an enterprise value up to £400 million.

== History ==
The firm which is based in London was founded in 1988 as Hambro European Ventures, the private equity investment arm of Hambros Bank. The principals of the firm completed a spinout from Hambros in 1998, following the bank's sale to Société Générale, and changed the name of the firm to Duke Street Capital Management Services and in 2008 to Duke Street Management Services. In June 2013, Duke Street sold a 35 per cent stake in itself to Tikehau Group, a French fund manager. In August 2018, the company rebranded as Duke Street Capital. The firm's managing partners are Charlie Troup and James Almond.

The firm has raised approximately £2.6 billion since inception across six private equity investment funds.

Duke Street, with Hutton Collins, acquired noodle restaurant chain Wagamama in March 2011 for £215 million from Lion Capital and announced its funding of the national and international expansion of the business.

In February 2012, Duke Street acquired a majority stake in legal services firm Parabis Group. In December 2014, Duke Street invested a further £13 million into Parabis Group to support substantial reforms in response to the Legal Services Act 2007, but in 2015, wrote down their £21.4 million investment.

Among the firm's other notable investments are Gala Bingo, Equity Insurance Group, Burton's Foods, Esporta Health Clubs, Getty Images, The Original Factory Shop, LM Funerals, Marie Brizard, Megabowl Oasis, Great Mills and Payzone. In August 2014, Duke Street together with Partners Group and Tikehau, acquired Voyage Care, a British care provider for people with different needs, from HG Capital for the sum of £ 375 million. In August 2015, Duke Street, with Searchlight Capital Partners, acquired controlling interests in two British construction equipment rental firms, Fork Rent and One Call Hire. In October 2017, Duke Street, backed by Goldman Sachs, acquired TeamSport Go Karting, the largest UK go karting operator ranking second largest globally, which was bought out by management in 2013.

In July 2018, Duke Street, for a sum of around £100million, became the new owner of Great Rail Journeys, a tour operator that offers escorted worldwide rail tour holidays, based in York.

In June 2021, Duke Street acquired the German consumer gardening products producer and distributor COMPO, based in Münster.

In November 2022, Duke Street acquired engineering services firm Suir Engineering from Dalkia and EDF Energy. In July 2024, Duke Street acquired Agito Medical, a provider of medical imaging equipment, spare parts and pre-owned equipment based in Aalborg, Denmark, from Philips for an undisclosed amount.

In December 2024, Duke Street acquired ForLife Group, a distributor of specialist stoma care products in the German and UK markets, from German healthcare provider GHD Gesundheits GmbH in a carve out deal.
