= Post Office Limited =

British retail post office company owned by the government of the United Kingdom

- Formerly: Post Office Counters Limited (1987–2001)
- Type: State-owned private company limited by shares
- Industry: Postal service
- Predecessor: General Post Office
- Founded: 13 August 1987
- Headquarters: London, England
- Area served: United Kingdom
- Key people: Nigel Railton (Chair); Neil Brocklehurst (CEO)
- Revenue: ▼£871 million (2025)
- Operating income: ▲£218 million (2025)
- Net income: ▲£92 million (2025)
- Owner: Government of the United Kingdom
- Number of employees: 3,604 (2025)
- Parent: Secretary of State for Business and Trade
- Website: postoffice.co.uk

Post Office Limited (formerly Post Office Counters Limited from 1987–2001) is a state-owned retail post office company in the United Kingdom that provides a wide range of postal and non-postal related products including postage stamps, banking, insurance, bureau de change and identity verification services to the public. It does this through its nationwide network of around 11,500 post office branches, which are run by franchise partners or by independent business people known as subpostmasters, under contracts with the Post Office.

Since 2020, a public enquiry has been under way into the company's actions which led to between 700 and 900 subpostmasters being wrongfully prosecuted for financial crimes, in what has been described by the Criminal Cases Review Commission as "the biggest single series of wrongful convictions in British legal history".

== History ==
Post Office branches, along with the Royal Mail delivery service, were formerly part of the General Post Office. After the passage of the Post Office Act 1969 the Post Office became a statutory corporation, with a network of almost 25,000 post office branches, including 1,765 Crown branches. Post Office Counters Limited was created as a wholly owned subsidiary of the Post Office in 1987. The first managing director of Post Office Counters was John Roberts, who took up the post in 1987.

In 1989, Crown branches began to be franchised to reduce costs, and the Crown network fell from 1,493 to 606 by 1997. A moratorium on further franchising was imposed by the New Labour government, but this was lifted the following year on the condition that 15% of revenue came from the Crown network. A former civil servant, Richard Dykes, took over as managing director of Post Office Counters in September 1993. Dykes was succeeded in May 1996 by Stuart Sweetman, who continued to serve in that role until his retirement in November 2001.

As part of the Postal Services Act 2000, the Post Office statutory corporation was changed to a state-owned public limited company, Consignia plc, in 2001, although the name was unpopular and was changed to Royal Mail Group just a year later. Post Office Counters Limited became Post Office Limited and in 2002, David Mills was appointed as chief executive of the Post Office, a newly created role. In October 2002, a three-year recovery plan was agreed, including the closure of 3,000 urban sub-post offices from an overall network of almost 18,000 branches. Mills stepped down at the end of 2005. His successor, Alan Cook, was appointed with the title of managing director in January 2006. Cook had previously been chief executive of National Savings & Investments.

With declining mail usage, the Post Office had chronic losses, leading to a reported £102 million lost in 2006, raising concerns in the media regarding its ability as a company to operate efficiently. Minutes of a board meeting in April 2006 state that the company was insolvent and unable to meet its future debts. Plans to cut the £150m-a-year subsidy for rural post offices led to the announcement that 2,500 local post offices were to be closed during 2007, with the 14,000-branch network considered unsustainable.

Changing face of the Post Office

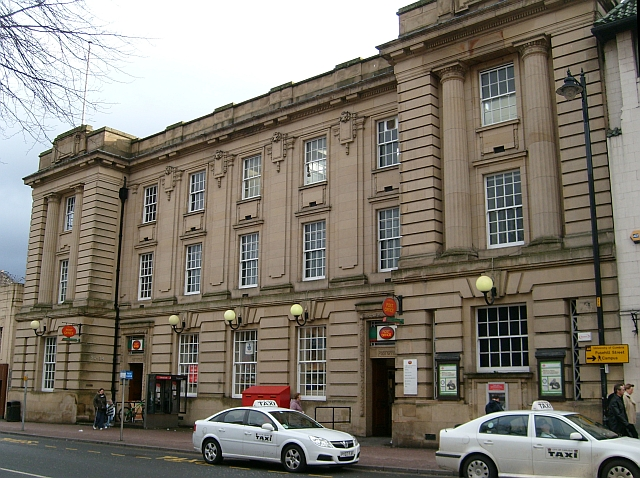
Carlisle's Crown post office was opened in 1916 and closed in 2008.

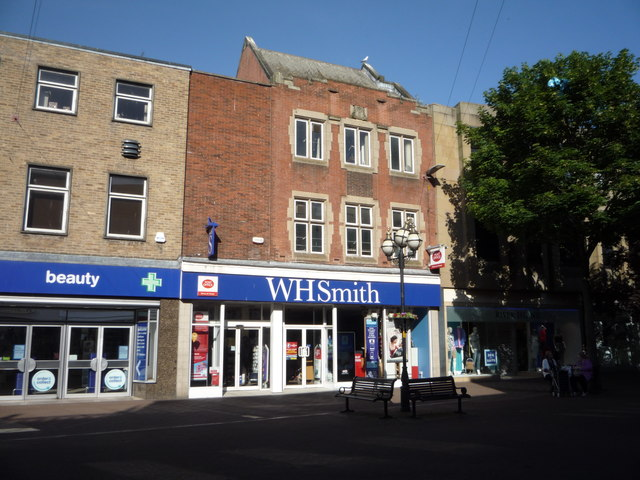
Its replacement was installed within the local branch of WHSmith.

In 2007, the government gave a £1.7 billion subsidy to Royal Mail Group so that it could turn a profit by 2011. This was to be used to invest across the whole network of Royal Mail, the Post Office, and Parcelforce. 85 Crown post offices were closed, 70 of which were sold to WHSmith. This followed a trial of 6 Post Office outlets in WHSmith stores. WHSmith was expected to make up to £2.5 million extra in annual profit. 2,500 sub-post offices closed between 2008 and 2009. Redundancy packages were provided from public funding (subpostmasters were paid over 20 months' salary, roughly £65,000 each).

In 2010, David Smith succeeded Alan Cook as managing director. Smith had previously been managing director of Parcelforce, another Royal Mail subsidiary. In November 2010, the government committed £1.34 billion of funding for 2011 to 2015 to the Post Office to enable it to modernise the Post Office network, with an agreement that the network would continue to have at least 11,500 branches.

As part of the Postal Services Act 2011, the Post Office became independent of Royal Mail Group on 1 April 2012. A ten-year inter-business agreement was signed between Royal Mail and the Post Office to allow post offices to continue issuing stamps, and handling letters and parcels for Royal Mail. The Act also contained the option for the Post Office to become a mutual organisation in the future. In April 2012, Paula Vennells was appointed as chief executive; she had been with the Post Office since 2007 as the network director. The first chair of the board of the new company was Alice Perkins, who had for a time led human resources management in the Civil Service.

In February 2013, the Post Office announced it was planning to move around 70 of its Crown post offices into shops. This would reduce the Crown network, which it stated was losing £40 million a year, to around 300. In November 2013, the government committed an additional £640 million of funding for 2015 to 2018 to allow the Post Office to complete its network modernisation. In June 2015, the Post Office launched a mobile virtual network operator service, Post Office Mobile. However, in August 2016 it decided "to conclude the trial as the results did not give us sufficient confidence that mobile will contribute to our goal of commercial sustainability".

Perkins stood down as chair in July 2015 and was replaced in October of that year by Tim Parker, a businessman who had led and restructured a number of companies. He at first worked one-and-a-half days a week, reducing to two days a month in November 2017. Speaking in 2024, Parker described a business in "deep crisis":

The Post Office has a turnover of just under £1 billion, which makes it a sort of medium-sized company, but in fact it is an incredibly complex business: it's complex because it operates a network of around 11,500 sites; it's complex because it has a very wide range of products; it's complex also because it deals with cash, and cash has a big security element to it; it's complex because it's in the public sector. [...] This is a business which had absorbed billions of pounds of taxpayers money and was still losing money. It was a business that faced significant challenges because it had an exclusive arrangement with the Royal Mail, and the Royal Mail itself was suffering from increasing competition in the parcels market and a declining letters market. The Post Office had previously had a significant amount of business from the Government, so driving licences, benefits, that kind of thing. That had all moved online and so the Post Office was bereft a significant chunk of its contribution. The Post Office had a range of products which it attempted to sell, with varying degrees of success, and it also had a very complex structure in terms of its overheads and management.

In January 2016, the Post Office announced plans to franchise 39 Crown branches and close 3 more. In April 2016, the Post Office agreed to hand over up to 61 more branches to WHSmith in a 10-year deal. The deal was condemned as "blatant back-door privatisation" by the Communications Workers Union. In January 2017, the Post Office announced it was to close and franchise another 37 Crown branches. In December 2017, the government agreed a £370 million funding deal for 2018 to 2021 to further modernise the Post Office network and protect rural branches. In June 2018, the Post Office agreed to acquire Payzone's UK bill payment business after it was split from Payzone Ireland, to expand its bill payment network. In October 2018, the Post Office announced that 74 more Crown branches would be franchised to WHSmith, including the 33 branches already operating in the company's stores under the 2016 agreement.

In February 2019, the Post Office announced that Vennells would leave her role as CEO to become chair of the Imperial College Healthcare NHS Trust. It was subsequently confirmed that the new CEO would be Nick Read, who had held senior roles at several customer-facing businesses and had been CEO of the Nisa convenience store group. Read promoted "click and collect" services for retailers, alongside parcel drop-off services.

In February 2021, the Post Office agreed to sell its broadband and home phone services to Shell Energy and exit the telecoms market. The purchase price was around £80 million, with around 500,000 customers transferring to the new provider.

Parker completed a second term as chair in September 2022. He was replaced in December by Henry Staunton, who had held senior board roles at a number of companies and had chaired WHSmith until June of that year. He was removed on 27 January 2024, following disagreements with the Business Secretary Kemi Badenoch on matters including the appointment of a new independent director.

In April 2024, CEO Read was "exonerated of all the misconduct allegations" in relation to claims made by a whistleblower, revealed in Parliament. This followed an investigation by an external barrister. Nigel Railton, previously CEO of Camelot UK, was appointed interim chair in May 2024 for a 12-month term. In September 2024, it was announced Read would step down as CEO and leave the Post Office in March 2025. He was replaced by Neil Brocklehurst as acting CEO, with the role being made permanent in April 2025. Railton was subsequently given a full three-year term as chair beginning in May 2025.

In November 2024, as part of a strategic review led by Railton, the Post Office announced it was considering the future of its Crown network, equating to up to 115 post office branches or around one per cent of the company's retail footprint. In April 2025, the Post Office confirmed plans to transfer its remaining 108 publicly facing Crown branches to franchises, with the franchising process being announced as complete in November 2025.

== Services ==
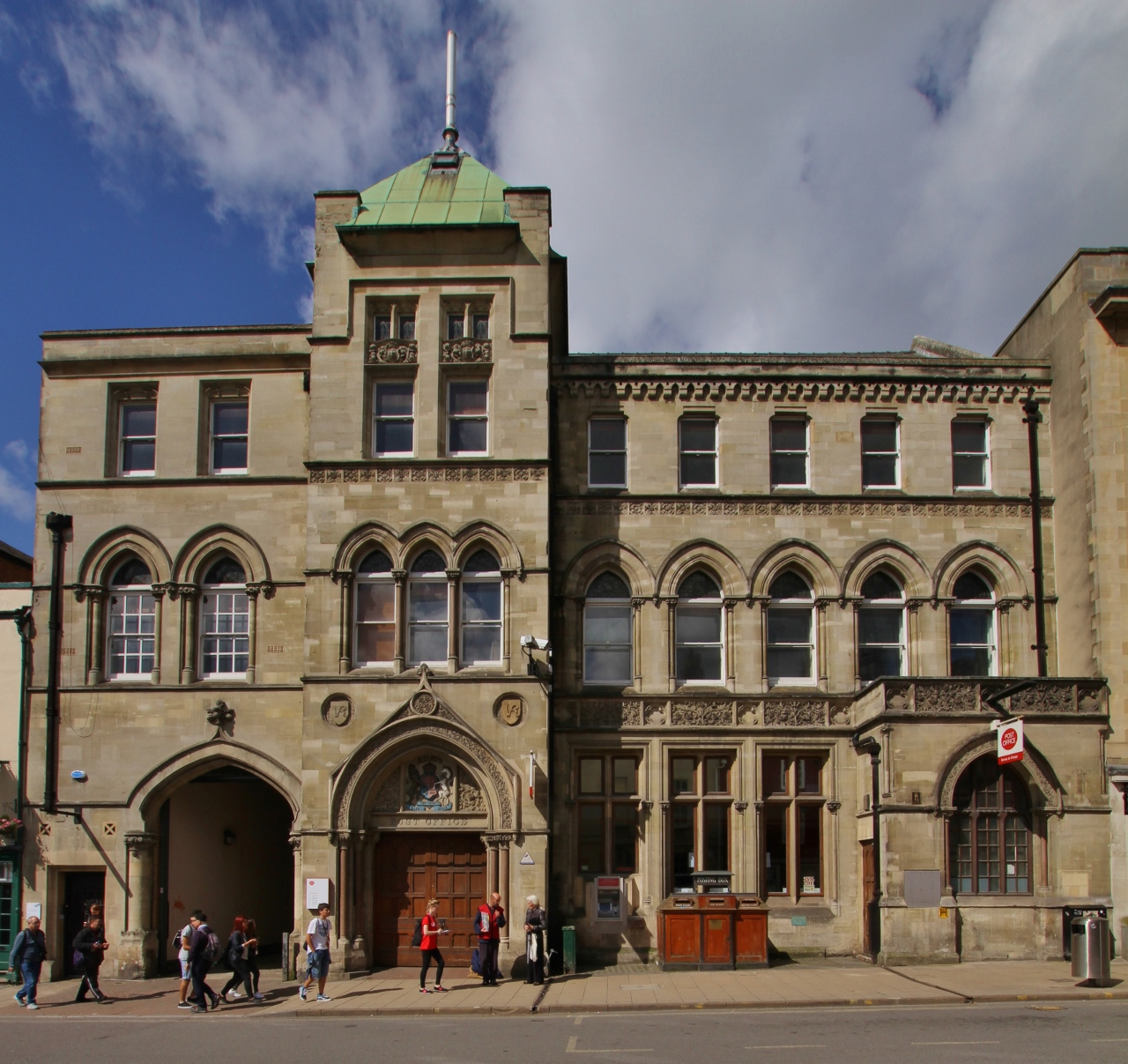
The post office in Oxford

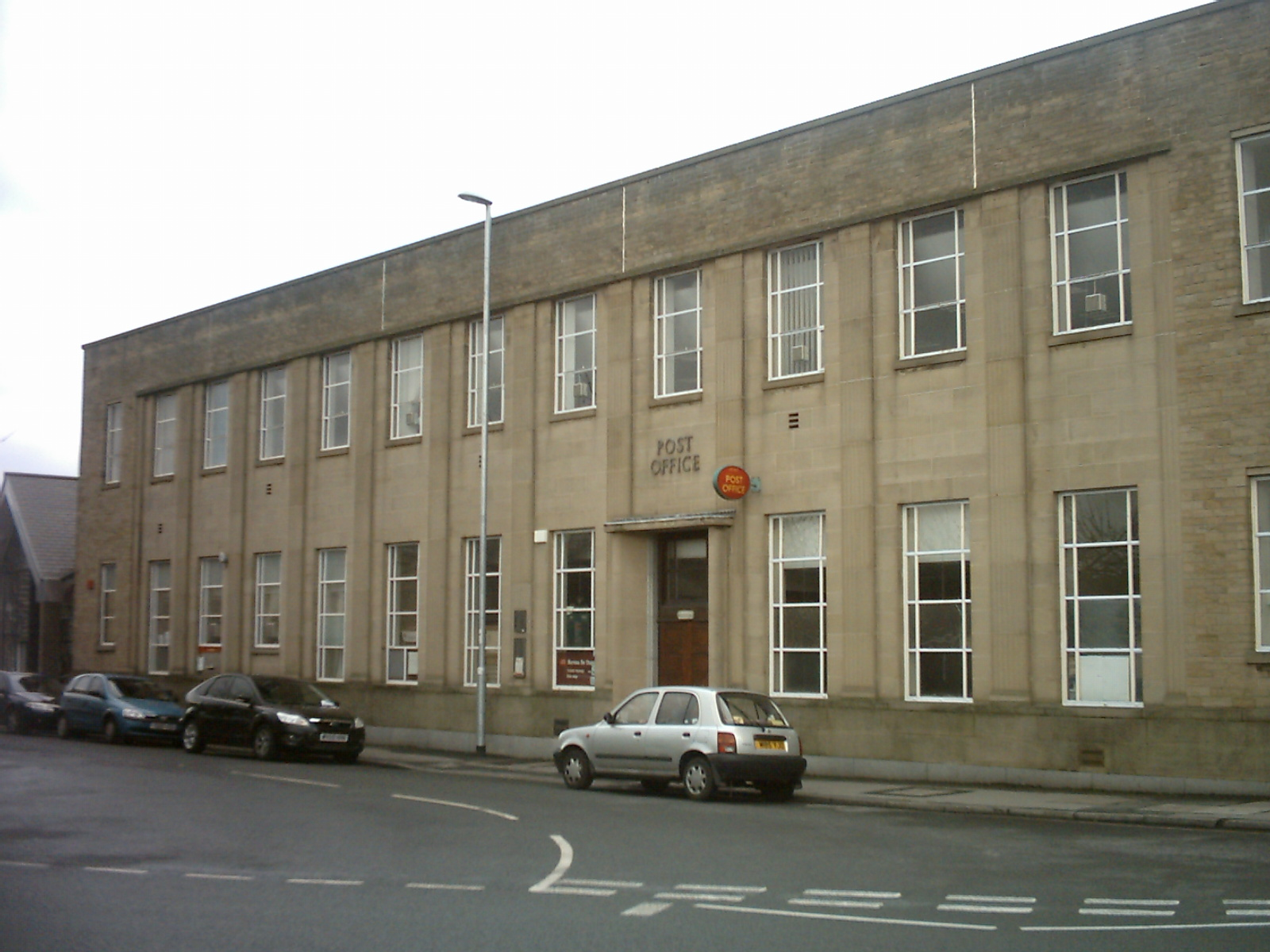
The post office in Otley, West Yorkshire

As of March 2025 there were 11,683 post office branches across the United Kingdom. The majority of branches (9,080 in total) were agency branches, run either by franchise partners or by local subpostmasters (who may be members of the National Federation of SubPostmasters or the CWU Postmasters Branch). Of the remaining branches, 1,669 were outreach services – typically small, part-time branches, perhaps making use of a mobile van or a village hall – and 823 were 'drop and collect' branches, focussing on pre-paid parcels and bill payments. There were also 111 branches that were directly managed by the Post Office (known as Crown branches), including 3 not open to the general public (located in the Houses of Parliament, Portcullis House and the Scottish Parliament).

The Post Office rolled out the 'ParcelShop' scheme in summer 2019, allowing retail stores to accept Royal Mail Internet returns, in order to expand Post Office facilities.

In some villages an outreach service is provided in village halls or shops. There are also "mobile post offices" using converted vans which travel between rural areas.

=== Postal services ===
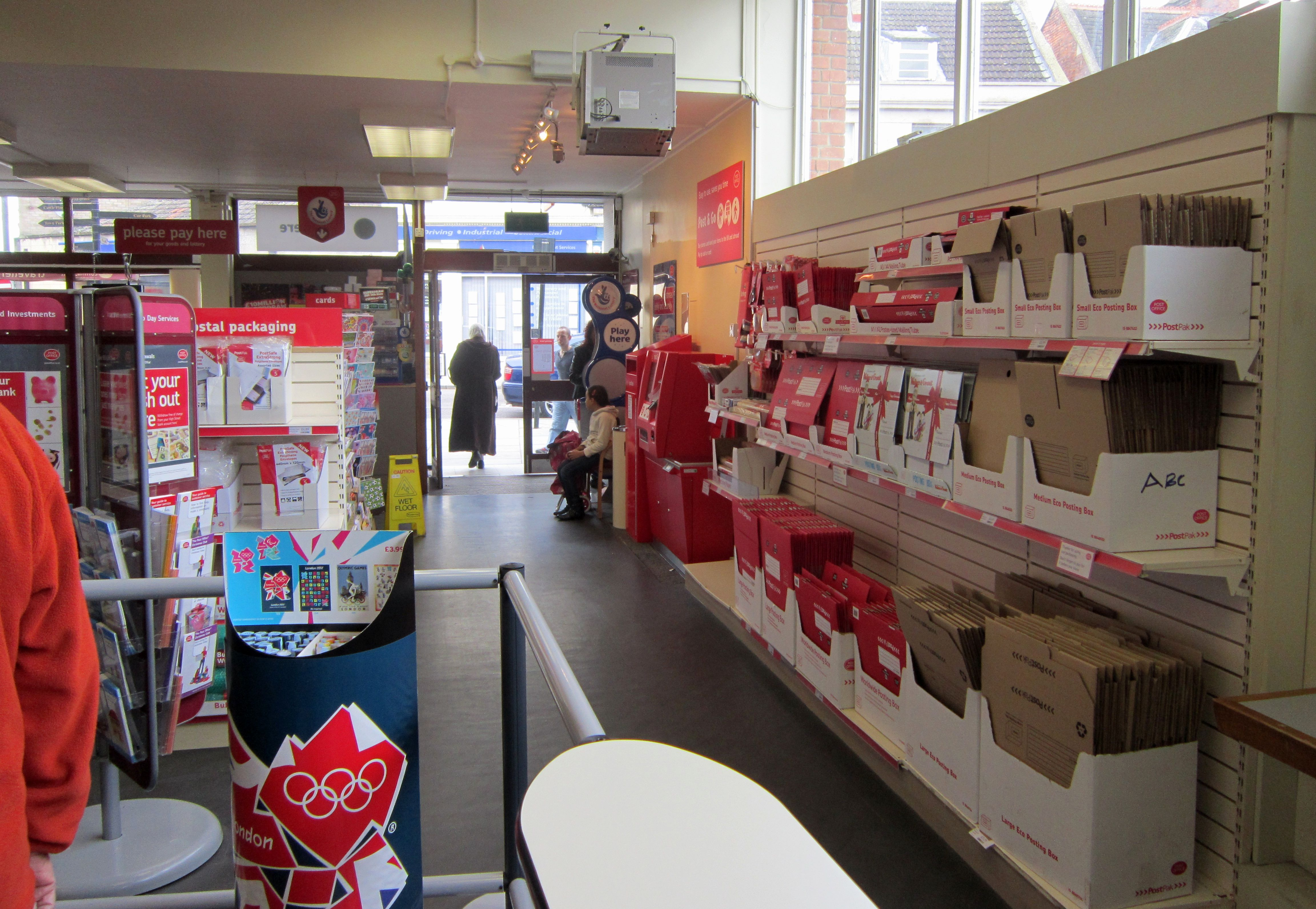
Interior of Trowbridge post office, showing available merchandise

The Post Office provides information on services and accepts postal items and payment on behalf of the two collection and delivery divisions of Royal Mail Group, Royal Mail and Parcelforce, plus parcel services on behalf of Evri and DPD.

==== Royal Mail Group ====
Services provided include a variety of new ordinary and guaranteed services both for delivery within the United Kingdom and to international destinations. Postage stamps (including commemorative stamps and other philatelic items) are sold, while applications for redirection of mail are accepted on behalf of Royal Mail. Post Office Local Collect is a scheme whereby undelivered mail can be redirected at customer request to a post office for convenient collection. Poste restante mail can also be held for collection by people travelling.

==== Other couriers ====
Since March 2021, Post Office no longer works exclusively with Royal Mail Group and offers parcel services from third party couriers including Evri and DPD, at selected locations.

=== Financial services ===
The Post Office provides credit cards, insurance products, access to high street banking services and savings through the Post Office Money umbrella brand which was launched in 2015. Most Post Office Money branded products are provided by Bank of Ireland (UK) plc with the Post Office acting as an appointed representative and credit broker. However, with the sale of Bank of Ireland UK's credit card portfolio to Jaja Finance in 2019, Post Office branded Credit Cards are now issued by Capital One UK. Life insurance is provided in partnership with Neilson Financial Services.

=== Branch banking ===
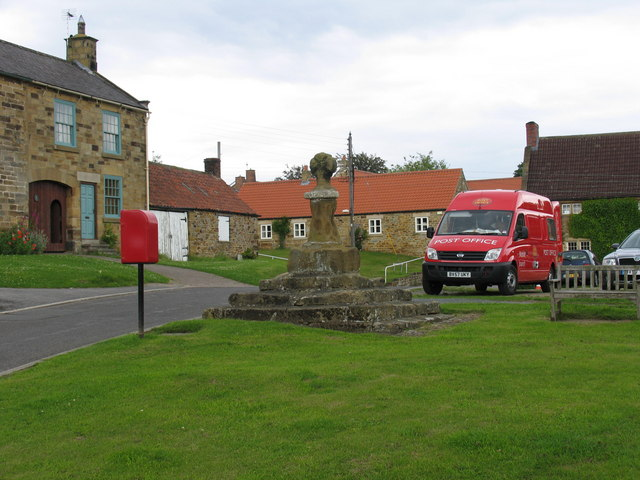
A mobile post office visiting Borrowby, North Yorkshire

Personal banking services are offered on behalf of a number of "partner banks" that the Post Office has agreements with. Although different services are available on behalf of different institutions, these may include cash withdrawals, paying in cash and cheques, and balance enquiries. Some post offices have cash machines, mainly provided by Bank of Ireland. Business banking services are also offered for customers of twenty different UK banks.

=== Bill payments ===
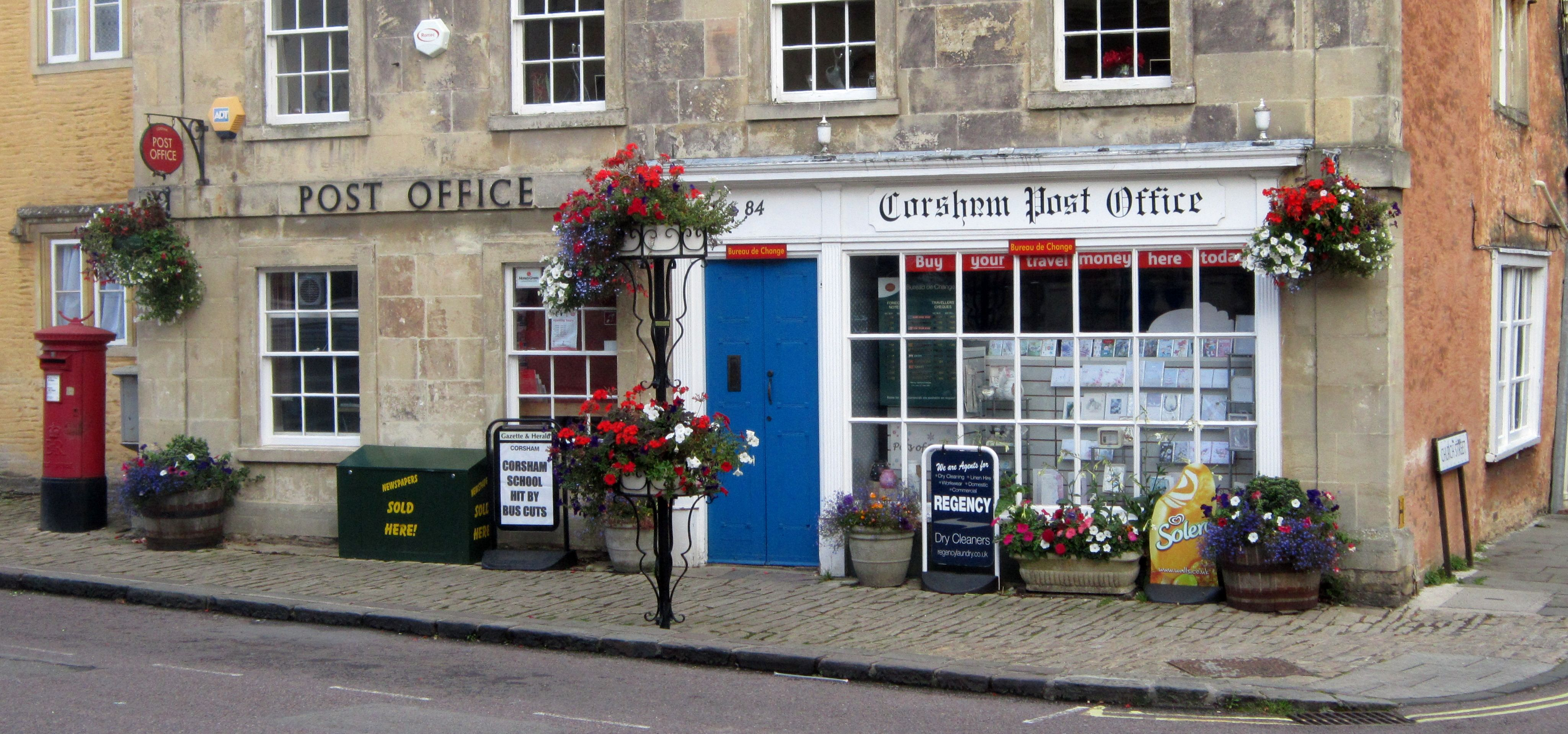
The post office in Corsham, Wiltshire

A number of bill payments can be accepted on behalf of a variety of organisations including utilities, local authorities and others. These are in the form of automated payments (barcoded bills, swipe cards, key charging). The Santander Transcash system, which had been a Girobank service, enabled manual bill payment transactions, but this service was discontinued by Santander in December 2017.

=== Directory enquiries ===
Post Office also runs its own flat-rate 118 Directory Enquiries service (118 855). Mobile phone top-ups are also available in Post Office branches on behalf of all the major UK mobile networks.

=== ID services ===
A passport check-and-send service is available for passport applications, where post office staff check that a passport application is filled in correctly and has an acceptable photograph accompanying it. The service is not affiliated with HM Passport Office and does not guarantee a successful application. Branches also offer a photocard driving licence renewal service.

Selected branches issue International Driving Permits. In 2019, availability of this service was expanded from 89 to approximately 2,500 branches due to increased demand associated with the possibility of a "no deal" Brexit.

== Horizon scandal ==
In April 2015, the BBC described a confidential report that alleged that the Post Office had made "failings" with regard to accounting issues with its Horizon IT system, which were identified by subpostmasters as early as 2000. The shortfalls could have been caused by criminals using malicious software, by IT systems or by human error, the report said. An earlier article by the BBC had claimed that a confidential report contained allegations that the Post Office had refused to hand over documents that the accountants felt they needed to investigate properly, that training was not good enough, that equipment was outdated, and that power cuts and communication problems had made things worse.

In 2019, the Post Office was lambasted by the High Court for its 'institutional obstinacy or refusal to consider' that its Horizon computer system might be flawed. The judge, Mr Justice Fraser, characterised this stance as "the 21st-century equivalent of maintaining that the earth is flat". In spite of the court action against its subpostmasters, which was described by a judge as "aggressive and, literally, dismissive", the Post Office's chief executive Paula Vennells, who had in the meantime left the Post Office and taken up posts in the NHS and the Cabinet Office, was controversially awarded a CBE in the 2019 New Year Honours for "services to the Post Office and to charity". On 19 March 2020 she was harshly criticised in the House of Commons, particularly by Kevan Jones, MP for North Durham, who said:

Obviously, as a board member she knew what was going on, including the strategy in the court case and the bugs in the system. What happened? She got a CBE in the new year's honours list for services to the Post Office. That is just rubbing salt into the wounds of these innocent people. There is a case for her having that honour removed, and I would like to know how she got it in the first place when the court case is ongoing. Added to that, she is now chair of Imperial College Healthcare NHS Trust. Again, I would like to know why and what due diligence was done on her as an individual.

On 8 January 2024, Prime Minister Rishi Sunak's spokesman said he would "strongly support" the Honours Forfeiture Committee if it decided to look at removing Vennells's CBE appointment. Vennells issued a statement on 9 January 2024, stating that she would "return my CBE with immediate effect". This had no formal effect, as only the monarch, on the advice of the Honours Forfeiture Committee, can annul honours. Vennells's appointment as CBE was formally revoked by King Charles III on 23 February for "bringing the honours system into disrepute".

== See also ==
- Penny Post Credit Union
- Postwatch
- 1st Class Credit Union
