= McCrostie =

McCrostie is a surname. Notable people with the surname include:

- John McCrostie (born c. 1970), American politician
- Lauren McCrostie (born 1996), English actress
