= Monica Dolan =

British actress (born 1969)

- Dolan in 2026
- Born: Monica Margaret Dolan; 15 March 1969 (age 57); Middlesbrough, North Riding of Yorkshire, England
- Education: Guildhall School of Music and Drama
- Occupation: Actress
- Years active: 1992–present
- Awards: BAFTA Award for Best Supporting Actress

Monica Margaret Dolan (born 15 March 1969) is an English actress. She won the BAFTA TV Award for Best Supporting Actress for playing Rosemary West in Appropriate Adult (2011) and the Laurence Olivier Award for Best Actress in a Supporting Role for All About Eve in 2019.

== Early life and education ==
Dolan was born in Middlesbrough, England, to Irish parents, and raised in Woking, Surrey, with three older siblings. She trained at the Guildhall School of Music and Drama.

== Career ==
Dolan"s credits include Agatha Christie's Poirot, Dalziel and Pascoe, Tipping the Velvet (with Rachael Stirling) and Judge John Deed. She also starred in ITV drama U Be Dead. In 2006, she played the future Queen Elizabeth the Queen Mother in the television drama Wallis and Edward.

Her stage appearances include Kate Hardcastle in She Stoops to Conquer, Regan in King Lear and Masha in The Seagull, the latter two with Ian McKellen.

Dolan played British serial killer Rosemary West in the ITV drama Appropriate Adult in 2011, receiving critical acclaim and a BAFTA TV Award for Best Supporting Actress.

On stage, she starred as Loretta in Chalet Lines, written by Lee Mattinson, at the Bush Theatre. In 2013, she portrayed twin sisters Meg and Mave Carter in the BBC TV series Call the Midwife. She appeared in W1A (a three-series follow-up to BBC2's BAFTA-winning comedy series Twenty Twelve), as Senior Communications Officer Tracey Pritchard.

In 2016, Dolan appeared as Janet McIntyre in the BBC two-part drama The Witness for the Prosecution, an Agatha Christie play adapted for television by Sarah Phelps.

In 2017, she made guest appearances in Catastrophe, Death in Paradise, and Strike, whilst also writing and starring in her debut one-woman play, The B*easts, at the Edinburgh Festival Fringe. The play went on to win an Edinburgh Stage Award.

In 2018, Dolan made a guest appearance in an episode of the fourth series of Inside No 9. Later that year, she portrayed Marion Thorpe in the critically acclaimed miniseries A Very English Scandal, receiving her second BAFTA nomination for Best Supporting Actress. The B*easts also transferred for a limited London run at the Bush Theatre.

In 2019, she portrayed Karen Richards in the stage production of All About Eve for which she received a Laurence Olivier Award for Best Supporting Actress.

June 2020 saw her appearing in the remade television series of Alan Bennett's Talking Heads on BBC One. In one of two newly written episodes, Dolan performed a monologue in "The Shrine". This was one of the episodes staged at London's Bridge Theatre in September 2020, with Dolan reprising her role.

In 2021, she appeared in The Dig, playing May Brown, wife of the archaeologist and astronomer Basil Brown, who discovered the Anglo-Saxon treasure at Sutton Hoo near Woodbridge, Suffolk.

In 2022, Dolan starred as Sister Aloysius in Doubt: A Parable at the Chichester Festival Theatre, receiving critical acclaim. She also appeared alongside Eddie Marsan in the ITV drama The Thief, His Wife and the Canoe as Anne Darwin. She has appeared in two episodes of Black Mirror: "Smithereens" from Series 5 and "Loch Henry" from Series 6.

In 2023, she played Carmel in six-part Channel 4 comedy drama The Change. She also starred in Typist Artist Pirate King, directed by Carol Morley, as British artist Audrey Amiss. The film had its UK premiere at the Glasgow Film Festival in March, and was released in October 2023, to positive reviews.

In January 2024, she played the role of subpostmistress Jo Hamilton in Mr Bates vs The Post Office, an acclaimed four-part ITV drama based on the true story of the Horizon IT scandal, which saw numerous innocent subpostmasters prosecuted for fraud. The series ignited considerable public and media interest and was watched by an estimated 13.5 million viewers. In August 2024, she appeared as Ann Branson, the mother of a murdered son, in the second series of the BBC TV drama Sherwood.

In March 2025, Dolan was nominated for both performances at the British Academy Television Awards, in the Best Actress and Best Supporting Actress categories respectively. She also received a nomination for Leading Actor - Female at the Royal Television Society Awards for Mr Bates vs The Post Office. In August 2025, it was announced that Dolan would be joining the cast of award-winning BBC sitcom Smoggie Queens.

She plays an amateur historian who uncovers the graves of hundreds of children buried at a former children's home in Ireland, in drama feature The Lost Children of Tuam. Based on a true story and produced by Liam Neeson, the film was released in October 2026. Dolan's performance was praised by Guardian reviewer Cath Clarke, who gave the film 4 out of 5 stars.

== Personal life ==
Dolan was raised Catholic and has spoken about its lasting influence on her outlook. In a 2020 interview, she remarked, "You never stop being a Catholic really – not culturally. It goes deep."

== Acting credits ==
=== Film ===
Year	Film	Role	Notes
1996	A Midsummer Night's Dream	Hermia	
1999	Topsy-Turvy	Miss Barnes	
2003	She Stoops to Conquer	Miss Kate Hardcastle	Video
2005	Guernsey	Claire	
2007	Hope	Mother	Short film
2009	Stalin: Reign of Terror	Pitkovskaya	
2010	The Arbor	Ann Hamilton	
2010	Never Let Me Go	Nurse	
2011	Meconium	Kel (voice)	Short film
2012	Sightseers	Janice	
2013	Bed Trick	Beatrice	Short film
2013	Out of Darkness		Short film
2013	Vice of Mind	Mother (voice)	Short film
2013	Kick-Ass 2	Tommy's Mum	
2013	Alan Partridge: Alpha Papa	Angela Ashbourne	
2014	Pride	Marion Cooper	
2014	The Falling	Miss Martha Alvaro	
2014	Twelve	Jodie	Short film
2015	Eye in the Sky	Angela Northman	
2017	Fern	Woman	Short film
2019	Official Secrets	Fiona Bygate	
2019	National Theatre Live: All About Eve	Karen Richards	
2019	Days of the Bagnold Summer	Sue Bagnold	
2019	Rialto	Claire	
2021	The Dig	May Brown	
2021	Cyrano	Marie	
2022	Empire of Light	Rosemary Bates	
2022	Typist Artist Pirate King	Audrey Amiss	
2022	A Woman Walks into a Bank	Narrator	Short film
2024	This Time Next Year	Connie	
2025	Book Club	Jane	Short film
2026	The Lost Children of Tuam	Catherine Corless	
2026	Elsinore	Linda Tolhurst	
2026	Onwards and Sideways	Liz Evans	

=== Television ===
Year	Title	Role	Notes
1993	The Bill	Mrs. Heaton	Series 9; Episode 154: "Cause for Concern"
1997	The Bill	Ruth Bell	Series 13; Episode 43: "A Bitter Pill"
1998	The Gift	Jo	Television film
2001	Judge John Deed	Natalie Abbott	Series 1; Episode 1: "Rough Justice"
2002	Dalziel and Pascoe	Megan Lowry	Series 7; Episode 1: "The Unwanted"
2002	Tipping the Velvet	Alice Astley	Mini-series; Episode 1
2005	Wallis & Edward	Elizabeth	Television film
2006	Agatha Christie's Poirot	Cora Gallaccio / Miss Gilchrist	Series 10; Episode 3: "After the Funeral"
2006	The Commander: Blacklight	DC Pamela Hayes	Television film
2007	The History of Mr. Polly	Annie Larkins	Television film
2008	Great Performances	Regan	Series 37; Episode 12: "King Lear"
2009	Occupation	Nicky Swift	Mini-series; Episodes 1–3
2009	U Be Dead	Maria Marchese	Television film
2009	Midsomer Murders	Imogen Stroud	Series 12; Episode 7: "The Great and the Good"
2010	Excluded	Amanda	Television film
2010	DCI Banks: Aftermath	Maggie Forrest	Series 1; Episodes 1 & 2: "Aftermath: Parts 1 & 2"
2011	Appropriate Adult	Rosemary West	Mini-series; Episodes 1 & 2 BAFTA TV Award for Best Supporting Actress
2012	Coming Up	Lisa	Series 10; Episode 4: "Spoof or Die"
2013	Call the Midwife	Meg / Mave Carter	Series 2; Episode 3
2013	Complicit	Judith	Television film
2013	The Escape Artist	Eileen Morris	Mini-series; Episodes 2 & 3: "Parts 2 & 3"
2014–2024	W1A	Tracey Pritchard	Series 1–4; 16 episodes
2015	Wolf Hall	Alice More	Mini-series; Series 1; Episodes 2 & 4: "Entirely Beloved" and "The Devil's Spit"
2015	The Casual Vacancy	Tessa Wall	Mini-series; Episodes 1–3
2016	Mid Morning Matters with Alan Partridge	Angela	Series 2; Episodes 1 & 4: "Foxhunter + Radio Play" and "Jasper + Chef"
2016	Neil Gaiman's Likely Stories	Dr. Marshall / Café Manager / Nora / Miranda Walker	Mini-series; Episodes 1–4
2016	The Witness for the Prosecution	Janet McIntyre	Mini-series; Episodes 1 & 2
2017	Death in Paradise	Patricia Lawrence	Series 6; Episode 2: "The Secret of the Flame Tree"
2017	Catastrophe	Polly	Series 3; Episode 2
2017	Strike	Leonora Quine	Series 1; Episodes 4 & 5: "The Silkworm: Parts 1 & 2"
2018	Inside No. 9	May	Series 4; Episode 3: "Once Removed"
2018	A Very English Scandal	Marion Thorpe	Mini-series; Episodes 2 & 3 Nominated — BAFTA TV Award for Best Supporting Actress
2018	Vanity Fair	Mrs. Peggy O'Dowd	Mini-series; Episodes 4–7
2018	Hang Ups	Alison Jones	Episodes 1 & 3
2018	God's Own County	Jackie	Television short film
2019	Christmas University Challenge	Herself - Contestant	Series 9; Episode 3: "Guildhall School of Music and Drama v UCL"
2019	Urban Myths	Catherine Dickens	Mini-series; Series 3; Episode 1: "Bleak House Guest"
2019, 2023	Black Mirror	CS Linda Grace, Janet McCardle	Series 5; Episode: "Smithereens", Series 6; Episode 2: "Loch Henry"
2020	Unprecedented	Kat	Episode 4
2020	Talking Heads	Lorna	Episode 12: "The Shrine"
2022	The Thief, His Wife and the Canoe	Anne Darwin	Mini-series; Episodes 1–4
2022	My Name is Leon	Maureen	Television film
2023	The Change	Carmel	Series 1; Episodes 1–6
2024	Celebrity Chase	Herself - Contestant	Series 14; Episode 2
2024	Mr Bates vs The Post Office	Jo Hamilton	Mini-series; Episodes 1–4
2024	Comic Relief: Funny for Money	Tracey Pritchard	Television film
2024	Inside No. 9	Herself	Series 9; Episode 6: "Plodding On"
2024	Sherwood	Ann Branson	Series 2; Episodes 1–6
2024	A Ghost Story for Christmas	Mrs. Dorman	Episode 18: "Woman of Stone"
2026	Smoggie Queens	Paula	Series 2; 3 episodes

=== Radio ===
Year	Title	Role	Notes
2025	High Cockalorum	Receptionists / Jackie	Radio play

=== Theatre ===
Year	Title	Role	Director	Venue
1992	The Merchant of Venice	Jessica	John Durnin	Northcott Theatre
1992	Outside Edge	Unknown	Martin Harvey	Northcott Theatre
1992	The Three Musketeers	Unknown	John Durnin	Northcott Theatre
1992	To Kill a Mockingbird	Unknown	Christopher Sergel	Northcott Theatre
1992–1993	Robin of the Wood	Much	John Durnin	Northcott Theatre
1994	Unfinished Business	Feebs	Steven Pimlott	Barbican Theatre
1994	Words, Words, Words	Performer	Unknown	The Other Place
1994–1995	Coriolanus	Virgilia	David Thacker	Swan Theatre; Barbican Theatre
1994–1995	Henry V	Princess Catherine	Matthew Warchus	Royal Shakespeare Theatre; Barbican Theatre
1994–1995	Measure for Measure	Juliet	Steven Pimlott	Royal Shakespeare Theatre; Theatre Royal, Newcastle
1995–1996	A Midsummer Night's Dream	Hermia	Adrian Noble	Barbican Theatre; Golden Gate Theatre; Shubert Theatre
1996–1997	Peter Pan	Unknown	Matthew Warchus	West Yorkshire Playhouse
1997	Jane Eyre	Jane Eyre	Polly Teale	UK tour
1998	The Glass Menagerie	Laura	Polly Teale	Royal Lyceum Theatre
1998	An Experiment with an Air-Pump	Maria Fenwick	Matthew Lloyd	Hampstead Theatre
1999	The Glory of Living	Lisa	Kathryn Hunter	Royal Court Theatre
1999	Hay Fever	Sorel Bliss	Declan Donnellan	UK tour
1999	The Taming of the Shrew	Katherine	Lindsay Posner	Barbican Theatre
2001	The Walls	Mary	Mick Gordon	Cottesloe Theatre
2001	Sliding with Suzanne	Suzanne	Max Stafford-Clark	Royal Court Theatre
2002–2003	A Laughing Matter	Peg Woffington / Hannah More	Max Stafford-Clark	Lyttelton Theatre; UK tour
2002–2003	She Stoops to Conquer	Kate Hardcastle	Max Stafford-Clark	Lyttelton Theatre; UK tour
2004	Mary Stuart	Mary	Patrick Sandford	Nuffield Theatre
2005	Macbeth	Lady Macbeth	Max Stafford-Clark	Oxford Playhouse; Arcola Theatre
2007–2008	King Lear	Regan	Trevor Nunn	Courtyard Theatre; UK & World tour
2007–2008	The Seagull	Masha	Trevor Nunn	Courtyard Theatre; UK & World tour
2008	Birth of a Nation	Painter	Ramin Gray	Royal Court Theatre
2013	Chalet Lines	Loretta	Madani Younis	Bush Theatre
2013	The Same Deep Water as Me	Anne / Georgina	John Crowley	Donmar Warehouse
2015	Plaques and Tangles	Megan	Lucy Morrison	Royal Court Theatre
2017	The B*easts	Tessa	John Hoggarth	Writer; Edinburgh Festival Fringe; Bush Theatre
2019	All About Eve	Karen Richards	Ivo van Hove	Noël Coward Theatre
2019	Appropriate	Toni Lafayette	Ola Ince	Donmar Warehouse
2020	The Shrine	Susan	Nicholas Hytner	Bridge Theatre
2022	Doubt: A Parable	Sister Aloysius	Lia Williams	Chichester Festival Theatre

== Awards and nominations ==
Year	Award	Category	Nominated work	Result	Ref
2012	British Academy Television Award	Best Supporting Actress	Appropriate Adult	Won	
2019	British Academy Television Award	Best Supporting Actress	A Very English Scandal	Nominated	
2019	Olivier Award	Best Actress in a Supporting Role	All About Eve	Won	
2023	Royal Television Society Award	Actor - Female	The Thief, His Wife and the Canoe	Nominated	
2025	Royal Television Society Awards	Actor - Female	Mr Bates vs The Post Office	Nominated	
2025	British Academy Television Award	Best Actress	Mr Bates vs The Post Office	Nominated	
2025	British Academy Television Award	Best Supporting Actress	Sherwood	Nominated	
