= The Falling (2014 film) =

2014 film by Carol Morley

- UK theatrical release poster
- Directed by: Carol Morley
- Written by: Carol Morley
- Produced by: Luc Roeg; Cairo Cannon
- Starring: Maisie Williams; Maxine Peake; Monica Dolan; Greta Scacchi; Mathew Baynton; Florence Pugh
- Cinematography: Agnes Godard
- Edited by: Chris Wyatt
- Music by: Tracey Thorn
- Production companies: BBC Films; British Film Institute
- Distributed by: Metrodome UK
- Release dates: 11 October 2014 (BFI); 24 April 2015 (United Kingdom)
- Running time: 102 minutes
- Country: United Kingdom
- Language: English
- Budget: £750,000
- Box office: $663,738

The Falling is a 2014 British drama film written and directed by Carol Morley. The film stars Maisie Williams and Florence Pugh (in her film debut) as best friends at an all-girls school, with Greta Scacchi, Monica Dolan, Maxine Peake, and Mathew Baynton in supporting roles.

The Falling premiered at the BFI London Film Festival on 11 October 2014, and was released in the United Kingdom on 24 April 2015. It received generally positive reviews.

== Plot ==
In 1969, Lydia and Abbie are best friends and classmates at an English girls' school. Lydia has a fixation on Abbie and has recently begun to explore more of her sexuality. After having sex with Lydia's brother Kenneth in an attempt to abort her pregnancy with another boy, Abbie begins to suffer from fainting spells, going into convulsions after a stint in detention with Lydia which leads to her death. Following Abbie's burial, Lydia begins suffering from similar fainting spells, and it soon becomes an epidemic, with numerous girls and a young teacher at the school spontaneously passing out for no more than a few seconds. Lydia becomes convinced that the administration must take action, much to the chagrin of the school's principal.

When an assembly is disrupted by a mass fainting episode, the school is temporarily shut down and all affected students are hospitalised and psychoanalysed. When no cause for the fainting spells is discovered, the school is reopened and Lydia is expelled. That same night, Lydia loses her virginity when she has sex with Kenneth, to whom she had developed an incestuous attraction after Abbie's death. Lydia's agoraphobic and neglectful mother Eileen catches them in the act and angrily kicks Kenneth out of the house before launching into a tirade against her own daughter, revealing that she and Kenneth are only half-siblings; Lydia herself being the product of rape.

Distraught by this revelation, Lydia flees the house as Eileen follows her, the first time she has ventured outside the house in over sixteen years. Searching for Lydia, Eileen is overcome with flashbacks of her rape before she locates Lydia, who, in a breakdown over Abbie's death, has climbed to the top of a tree near the school where she and Abbie spent their time together. Lydia challenges her mother's lack of maternal affection before losing her footing and falling into the lake. A frantic Eileen ventures into the water, finding her daughter’s seemingly drowned body and cradles her in despair. Lydia unexpectedly regains consciousness as they embrace and reconcile.

== Cast ==
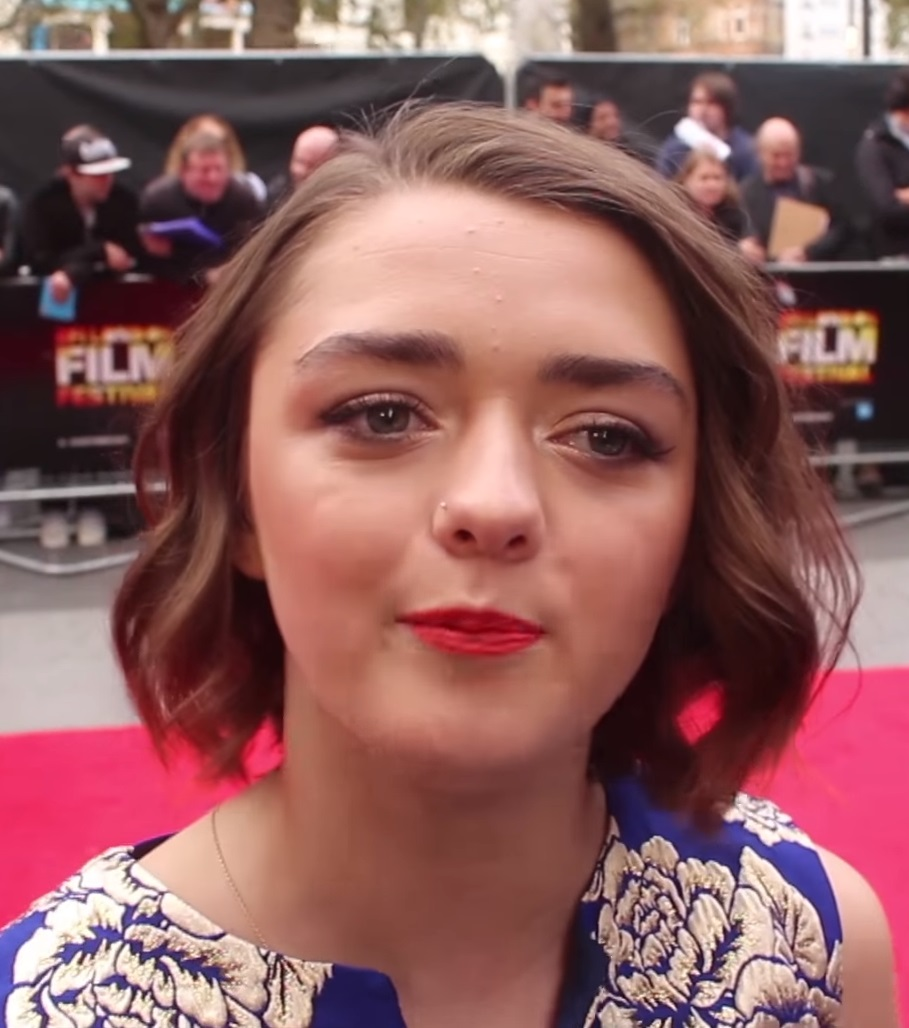
Maisie Williams at The Falling Premiere 2014

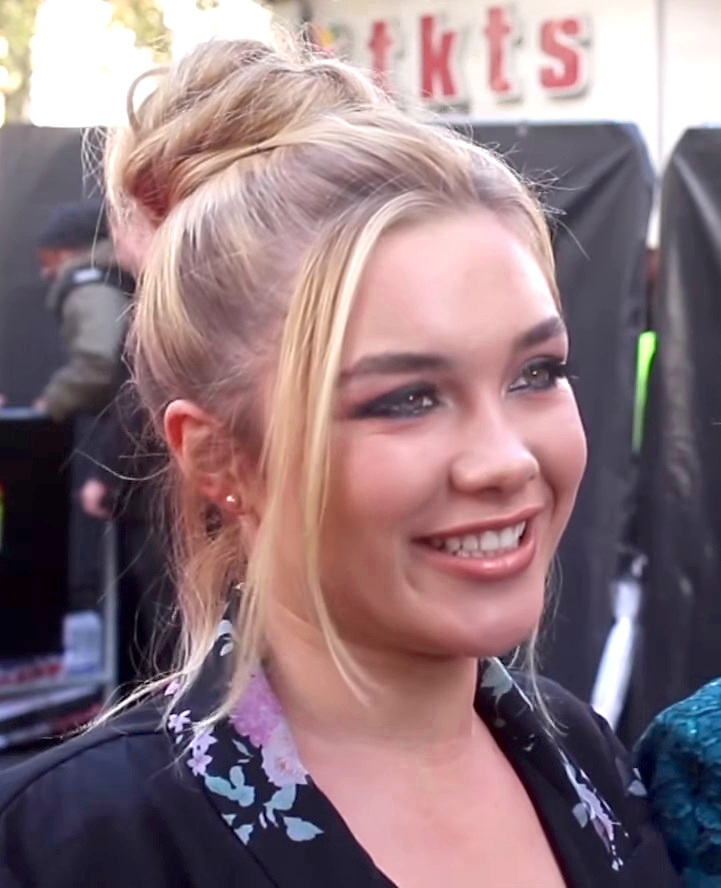
Florence Pugh at The Falling Premiere 2014

- Maisie Williams as Lydia "Lamb" Lamont
- Florence Pugh as Abigail "Abbie" Mortimer
- Maxine Peake as Eileen Lamont
- Monica Dolan as Miss Alvaro
- Greta Scacchi as Miss Mantel
- Mathew Baynton as Mr. Hopkins
- Joe Cole as Kenneth Lamont
- Morfydd Clark as Pamela Charron
- Lauren McCrostie as Gwen
- Hannah Rose Caton as Titch

== Production ==
BFI funded the film £750K. Production began in October 2013. The soundtrack is by Tracey Thorn. Morley asked Thorn to provide the music for the film after editing had begun.

== Release ==
The Falling premiered at the BFI London Film Festival on 11 October 2014. It had a limited release in the United Kingdom, grossing £442,177 with a further £10,051 grossed in New Zealand. US DVD sales amounted to another £6,406.

== Reception ==
On the review aggregator website Rotten Tomatoes, 78% of 40 critics' reviews are positive, with an average rating of 6.8/10. The site’s consensus states, “Well-acted and overall unsettling, The Falling delivers thought-provoking thrills -- and suggests a bright future for writer-director Carol Morley.” On Metacritic, which uses a weighted average, the film has a score of 71 out of 100 based on 9 critics, indicating "generally favorable" reviews.

Mark Adams of Screen International wrote, "It is a film that will resonate with some but leave others exasperated, but The Falling is certainly a bold film and one to be admired and appreciated." Guy Lodge of Variety called it "an imperfect but alluring study of psychological contagion that marks an auspicious advance in the field of narrative filmmaking for acclaimed docu maker Carol Morley".

Leslie Felperin of The Hollywood Reporter called it "a flawed but fascinating period study of female friendship and hysteria". Trevor Johnston of Time Out London rated it four out of five stars and wrote, "Carol Morley shows startling versatility and ambition with this jawdropping mash-up of If... and Picnic at Hanging Rock". Mike McCahill of The Daily Telegraph rated it four out of five stars and called it a continuation of the themes in Nicolas Roeg's Performance and Don't Look Now.

Geoffrey Macnab of The Independent rated it four out of five stars and wrote, "Carol Morley's The Falling is beguiling and disturbing, a beautifully made and very subtle affair that combines melodrama, rites of passage and supernatural elements in an utterly intriguing way." Peter Bradshaw of The Guardian rated it five out of five stars and wrote, "Director Carol Morley has come up with another brilliant and very distinctive feature, about an epidemic of fainting that grips a girls school in the 1960s."

Elise Nakhnikian of Slant Magazine gave a less favourable review, writing that "the film all leads to a melodramatic climax that wraps up the main character's explosive acting out in a too-neat package." David Jenkins of Little White Lies also gave an unfavourable review, writing, "Carol Morley follows up the mesmerising Dreams of a Life with a tedious period drama set in an all-girls school."

Simon Wessely writing in The Lancet Psychiatry noted that the film "beautifully captured" the original 1973 case report of an episode of mass psychogenic illness that was its inspiration.

=== Accolades ===
Year	Award	Category	Nominee	Result	Ref.
2014	BFI London Film Festival	Best British Newcomer	Florence Pugh	Nominated	
2014	BFI London Film Festival	Best Film	Carol Morley	Nominated	
2015	London Film Critics' Circle	Young British/Irish Performer Of The Year	Maisie Williams	Won	
2016	Evening Standard British Film Awards	Rising Star	Maisie Williams	Won	

== See also ==
- Mass psychogenic illness
- HELLP syndrome
