= James Jaysen Bryhan =

British actor

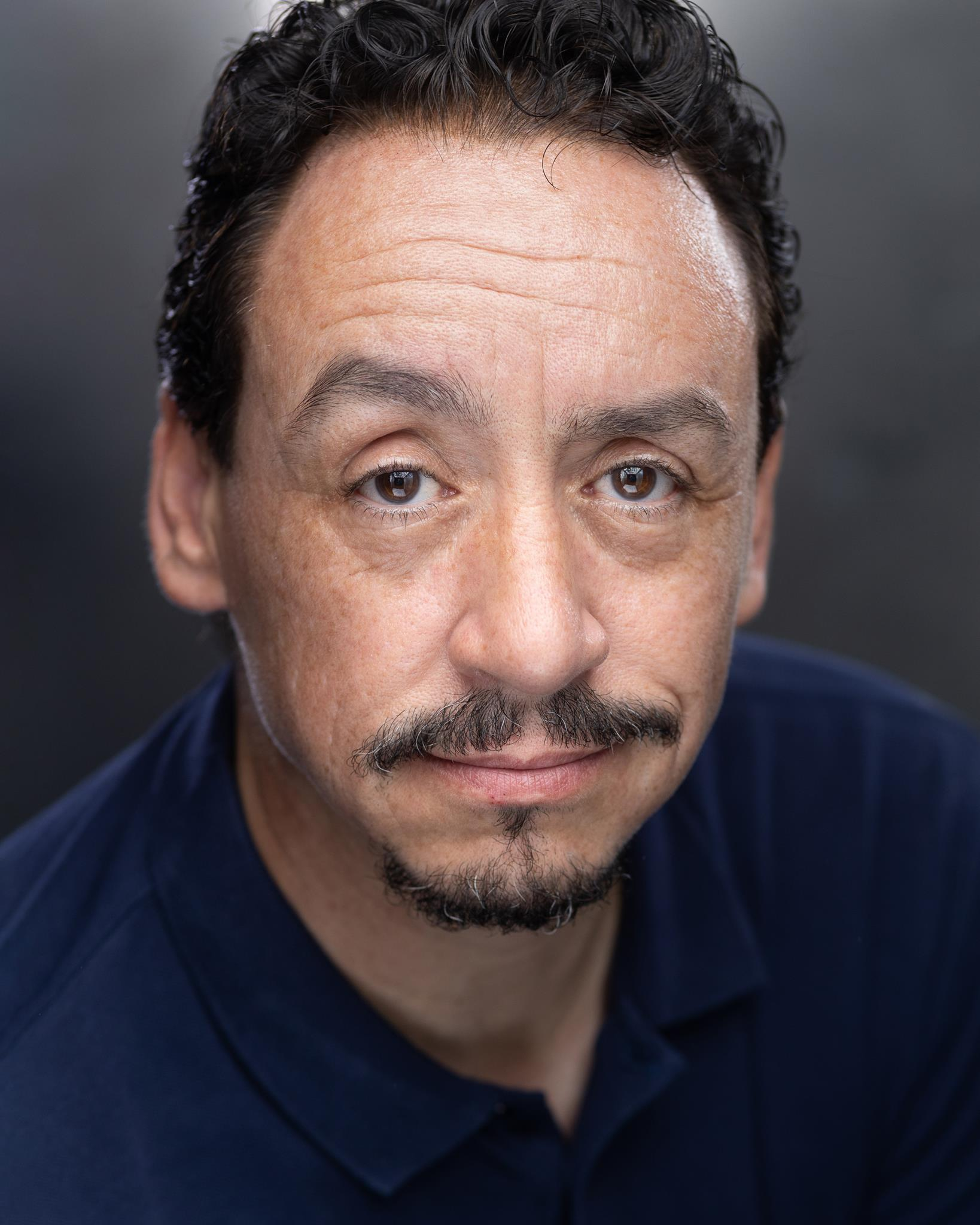
- Born: 13 February 1974 (age 52); Bournville England
- Occupation: Television / film actor
- Years active: 2008
- Website: vshowcards.com/profile/jamesbryhan/

James "Jaysen" Bryhan (born 13 February 1974) is a British television actor, best known for his role as Butch Hawke in the British film ballistic and The Archivist in Shadow and Bone (TV series)

== Career ==
James graduated The Birmingham Theatre School in 2009, and began his career on the theatre stage. His stage credits include a nuanced lead performance as Ray in David Harrower's critically acclaimed psychological drama Blackbird.

In 2014, playing the lead part of Lance Cooper in the British horror thriller, The Apostate: Call of the revenant alongside British actress Terri Dwyer.

In 2015, Bryhan portrayed the older Albert Einstein alongside Guy Henry detailing his life.

Since September 2015 Bryhan was rumored to play the role of Ramirez, made famous by Sean Connery in the upcoming reboot of Highlander, directed by Cedric Nicolas-Troyan.

Over the last decade, James has been featured in dozens of movies and TV shows, including the popular Netflix series Shadow and Bone (TV series), Carol Morley's Typist Artist Pirate King, and he was cast as the protagonist in the 2024 feature film Ballistic.

James was honored by the Midlands Movie Awards in 2024 for his role as Pat Gunther in Dig Me No Grave hosted by Michael Sales and BBC host, Ed Stagg.

== Filmography ==
- Bluff (2022) - Collins
- Shadow and Bone (TV series) (2019) – Archivist
- Typist Artist Pirate King (2022) – Kitchen Porter
- Ballistic (film) (2024) - Butcher
- Dig me no grave (film) (2025) - Pat Gunther
