= Typist Artist Pirate King =

British drama film

- Directed by: Carol Morley
- Screenplay by: Carol Morley
- Produced by: Ameenah Ayub Allen; Cairo Cannon
- Starring: Monica Dolan; Kelly Macdonald; Gina McKee
- Cinematography: Agnès Godard
- Edited by: Alex Mackie
- Music by: Carly Paradis
- Production companies: Cannon and Morley Productions; MBK Entertainment; LipSync Productions; Genesis Entertainment; BBC Films
- Distributed by: Modern Films
- Release dates: 19 November 2022 (Tallinn); 8 March 2023 (Glasgow); 27 October 2023 (United Kingdom)
- Running time: 106 minutes
- Country: United Kingdom
- Language: English
- Box office: $126,822

Typist Artist Pirate King is a 2022 British film written and directed by Carol Morley, about the life and art of artist, Audrey Amiss. It stars Monica Dolan as Amiss, as well as Kelly Macdonald, and Gina McKee. The film had its world premiere at the Tallinn Black Nights Film Festival on 19 November 2022; and a UK premiere at the Glasgow Film Festival on 8 March 2023 at Glasgow Film Theatre.

== Synopsis ==
The film is a fictionalised portrait of the late "avant-garde and misunderstood" artist Audrey Amiss. Amiss was an artist who studied at the Royal Academy of Arts, but was unable to complete her training after being hospitalised due to mental illness. She died in 2013, leaving behind a vast collection of artworks and writings which were discovered after her death, and subsequently donated posthumously to Wellcome Collection.

The film centres on a fictionalised road trip with Amiss, played by Monica Dolan, and her psychiatric nurse, played by Kelly Macdonald, in which they travel north and reconnect with key individuals and moments from Amiss's past.

The film is based on extensive archival research into Amiss's archive at Wellcome Collection, undertaken while writer-director Carol Morley was a recipient of a Wellcome Screenwriting Fellowship. The film uses imagery and artworks from the archive collection, creating a fictionalised narrative of a real life individual, drawn from archival sources.

== Cast ==
- Monica Dolan as Audrey Amiss
- Kelly Macdonald as Sandra
- Gina McKee as Dorothy
- Christine Bottomley as Joan
- Kieran Bew as Gabe Patier
- James Jaysen Bryhan as Kitchen Porter
- Kya Brame as Pouting Pamela
- Joanne Allen as Knitting Nelly
- Gavin Kitchen as Policeman
- Matilda Firth as Magic Girl

== Production ==
Carol Morley was awarded a Wellcome Screenwriting Fellowship in 2015, where she was introduced to the Audrey Amiss Archive by archivists at Wellcome Collection. The archive had recently been acquired by Wellcome in 2014, donated by Audrey's niece and nephew a year after Amiss's death in 2013. Morley undertook extensive research at Wellcome using Amiss's archive, with the aim of developing a film about Amiss.

The archive comprises hundreds of sketchbooks, scrapbooks, log books, photo albums, account books, record books, and paintings. Morley made use of the collection while it was uncatalogued, with cataloguing later beginning in 2018 to ensure that the collection could be made more widely available for public use. (The collection has since been fully catalogued and is now freely available to consult for research in the Wellcome Library.) During the research process, she also met with members of Amiss's family and others who knew her in life, as well as speaking with archivists, conservator, and other Wellcome staff. She wrote about her experiences researching Amiss for a 2016 piece in The Observer.

The title of the film derives from Amiss's passport, where she listed her occupation as: 'typist artist pirate king'. The passport is held in Audrey Amiss' archive at Wellcome Collection.

Morley received funding from the British Film Institute to write and produce the film. In November 2021, Monica Dolan, Kelly Macdonald, and Gina McKee were announced as being on-board the project, with Jane Campion acting as executive producers and Metro International handling sales. Also involved were director of photography Agnès Godard and production designer Janey Levick. Additional funding also came from BCP Asset Management, MBK Productions, LipSync, Genesis Entertainment, Wellcome Trust, and BBC Films. Producers for the feature were Ameenah Ayub Allen and Cairo Cannon. Filming started in November 2021 in Yorkshire. The film entered post-production in 2022.

== Release ==
The film had its world premiere at the Tallinn Black Nights Film Festival on 19 November 2022. The film had its UK premiere on 9 March 2023 at the Glasgow Film Festival. In May 2023, Metro International sold distribution rights to the film for the United Kingdom and Ireland to Modern Films. Planned limited release is set for 27 October 2023, with a wider release one week later on 3 November 2023.

The film was released on the Netflix streaming service on 12 July 2024.

== Reception ==
=== Critical reception ===
Peter Bradshaw in The Guardian described a "warm and sympathetic film" and that the "casting works with the writing and the black comic and tragicomic nature of their ordeal is often hilarious." Later in the year, Bradshaw named Carol Morley’s directing and mentioned the performance of Dolan as among the best on film in 2023.

=== Box-office ===
The film grossed £28,654 at the UK box office in its opening weekend, where it played in 25 theaters in the territory. For its second weekend in cinemas, the film recorded a 73% drop on its opening weekend, only managing to gross £7,739, making a total of £53,298.
