= U Be Dead =

- Genre: Drama
- Written by: Gwyneth Hughes
- Directed by: Jamie Payne
- Starring: David Morrissey; Tara Fitzgerald; Monica Dolan; Lucy Griffiths
- Composer: Dominik Scherrer
- Country of origin: United Kingdom

Production
- Executive producer: John Smithson
- Producer: Elinor Day
- Running time: 94 minutes
- Production company: Darlow Smithson Productions

Original release
- Network: ITV
- Release: 5 July 2009 (New Zealand); 5 September 2010 (UK)

U Be Dead is a British TV film first broadcast in New Zealand in 2009, based on a true story. The film was shown in the United Kingdom on 5 September 2010 on ITV, and released in France on 2 July 2010 on television Arte HD, and in Australia premiered as a telemovie on the ABC in January 2011.

== Plot ==
A psychiatrist Dr Jan Falkowski and his fiancee Debra Pemberton are mysteriously stalked and harassed by a woman they have never met who claims to be in love with Falkowski. The woman sends text messages and anonymous phone calls to the couple, their colleagues and even their wedding caterer. Debra receives death threats claiming that she will be burnt and shot if she goes through with the wedding. The relationship has broken down under the strain and the wedding is called off, but a trap is set for their tormentor. On police advice, the engaged couple pretend to go ahead with their wedding plans, and the anonymous stalker is caught in a phone booth on the "wedding day", preparing to send more threats. She is revealed as Maria Marchese, whose former boyfriend was a patient of Dr Falkowski. A police investigation begins, but then suddenly the Crown Prosecution Service lawyers reveal that they are dropping the case against Maria. Dr Falkowski starts a new relationship with Bethan Ancell, a friend from his powerboat racing exploits. But worse is yet to come as Dr Falkowski is accused of rape by Maria. The evidence seems damning and a criminal prosecution begins against him, causing him to lose his job. A further 18 months of torment go by until a crucial new piece of forensic evidence shatters the web of lies spun by Maria Marchese and leads to her downfall. Dr Falkowski and Bethan have to try to put it behind them and start a new life, hoping that Maria will never be able to track them down again.

== Cast ==
- David Morrissey – Dr. Jan Falkowski
- Alex Lowe – Drew Langdon
- Tara Fitzgerald – Debra Pemberton
- Dearbhla Molloy – Dr. Bernice Falkowska
- Michael Elwyn – Prof. Wojciech Falkowski
- Thomas Craig – DC Lee Rutter
- Alexis Zegerman – Gemma
- Richard Lumsden – DI Steven Thorpe
- Lucy Griffiths – Bethan Ancell
- Susannah Wise – Laura
- Jan Francis – Irene Pemberton
- John McArdle – Brian Pemberton
- Kate Steavenson-Payne – Helena
- Monica Dolan – Maria Marchese
- David Groves – Damian Falkowski
