= Screen Stockport Film Festival =

Former British film festival

- Logo
- Location: Stockport, Greater Manchester, England
- Founded: 2011
- No. of films: 40+ (2014)
- Festival date: 17 October 2015
- Website: screenstockport.co.uk

The Screen Stockport Film Festival was a film festival held annually at the Plaza Cinema in Stockport, Greater Manchester, England, in which short and feature films made locally, nationally and internationally were entered. It was considered the main film festival for North West England.

It was founded in 2011. There were six categories of films and several awards for roles in films, as well as the type of film.

Each year the festival had special guests. Previous guests included:

- Phil Hawkins
- Col Needham
- Mark Herbert
- Carol Morley

The event was sponsored by IMDb, and Col Needham, the founder of the company, was a guest speaker in 2012.
