= Bluff (2022 film) =

2022 crime film directed by Sheikh Shahnawaz

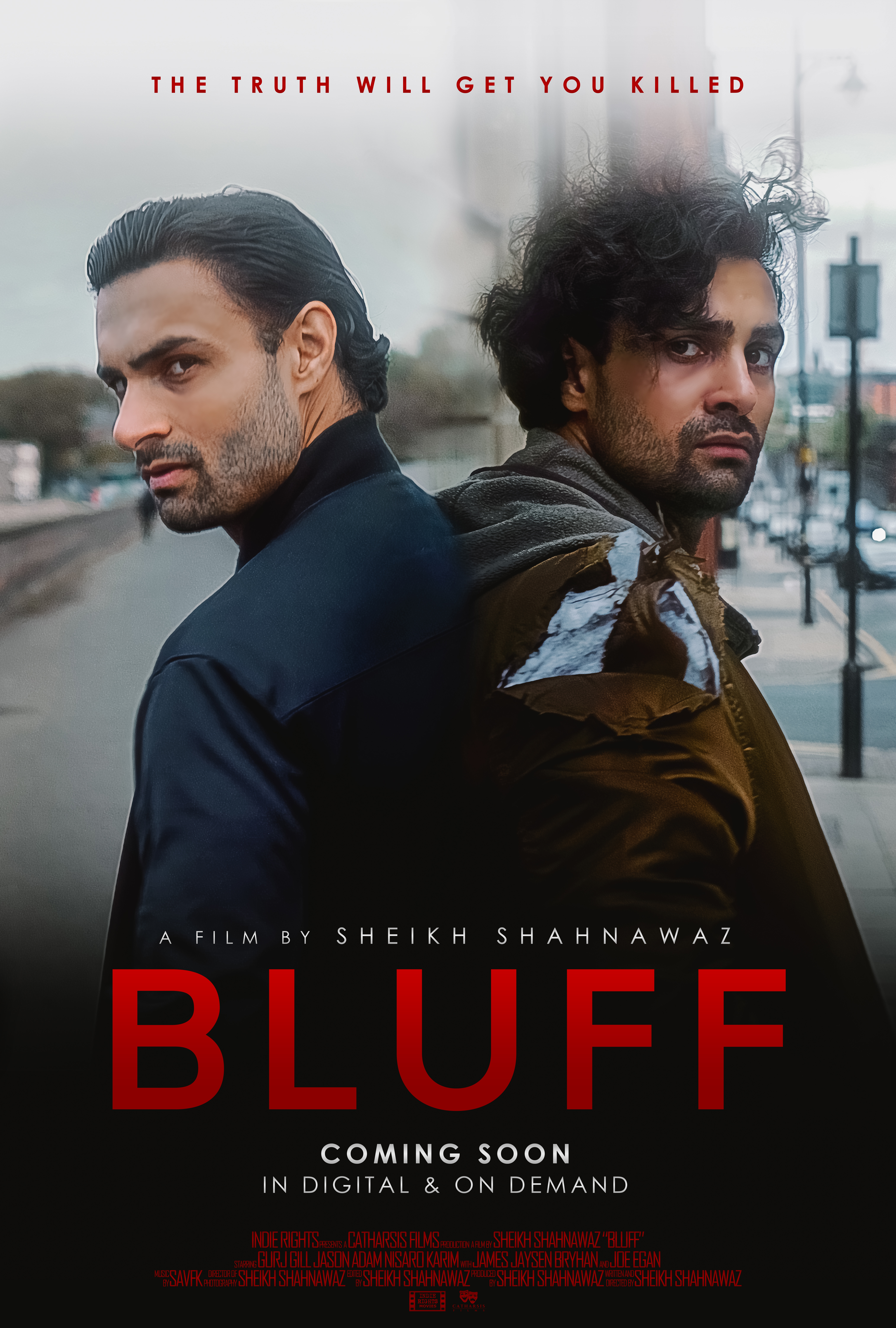
- Film poster
- Directed by: Sheikh Shahnawaz
- Written by: Sheikh Shahnawaz
- Produced by: Sheikh Shahnawaz
- Starring: Gurj Gill; Jason Adam; Nisaro Karim; James Jaysen Bryhan; Joe Egan
- Cinematography: Sheikh Shahnawaz
- Edited by: Sheikh Shahnawaz
- Music by: Savfk
- Production company: Catharsis Films
- Distributed by: Indie Rights
- Release date: 28 April 2022
- Running time: 115 minutes
- Country: United Kingdom
- Language: English
- Budget: $2,000

Bluff is a 2022 independent neo-noir crime thriller film written, directed, filmed, edited and produced by Sheikh Shahnawaz. It tells the story of a London police officer who goes undercover as a heroin addict in a small town and manipulates an unsuspecting local junkie into working with him for a dangerous drug dealer.

== Plot ==
The film starts with a junkie going to buy some drugs from a dealer. It then flashes forward to the present to show that the junkie is actually an undercover police officer who is seeing a therapist. It then flashes back even further into the past to show that the police officer is Detective Sergeant Daniel Miller. Miller has just been suspended from the London Metropolitan Police so that his superior, Chief Constable Collins, can secretly assign him on a long-term undercover deployment in a small town to investigate drug trafficking organizations by posing as a heroin addict.

Miller begins his investigation by befriending and manipulating a local gullible junkie named Cooks. The film flashes forward to show Miller and Cooks now successfully working for a dangerous drug dealer named Imran. The film continues to flash forward and backwards in time from these two points of Miller’s investigation. The past Miller continues to gain Cooks’s trust to get more information on Imran. The future Miller continues to gain Imran’s trust to get more information on his drug operation with the help of Cooks who now also knows about Miller’s true identity.

In a desperate attempt to make some progress in his investigation, past Miller pretends to be suffering from withdrawal because he can no longer afford to buy drugs and Cooks takes the bait and agrees to work for Imran with him. Future Miller has a close encounter with a rival gang member who tries to rob him at knifepoint but Miller manages to fight him off and save the drugs which impresses Imran who brings Miller closer to his inner circle. Past Miller and Cooks make a daring attempt to contact Imran but they are intercepted by his enforcer Neil. They are taken to a remote building where Imran waits to interrogate them but against all odds, Cooks manages to convince Imran to let them both work for him.

Past Miller and Cooks are making such good progress selling drugs for Imran that they get an apartment to operate out of and are given an even bigger batch of drugs to sell but Cooks is starting to get high more often now. Future Miller overhears Imran talking to Neil about going away on business, Miller speculates this must be to meet his supplier and decides to follow Imran. Past Miller discovers that their latest batch of drugs was stolen when Cooks got high and passed out in the apartment. Imran and Neil arrive at the apartment and threaten to kill both of them but Cooks takes all the blame. At the same time, future Miller follows Imran to find him meeting with another senior police officer which means Imran was a protected informant for the police all along. Past Miller is forced to watch Cooks inject a lethal dose of fentanyl to which we discover that Cooks was dead all along and future Miller had been hallucinating him the whole time.

Future Miller meets with Collins who wants to shut down the investigation as there is nothing they can do about Imran if he is a protected informant but Miller refuses to let Cooks death be in vain. Miller confronts Imran and kills him. We flash forward to the present where Miller is seeing the therapist, despite killing Imran, Miller’s hallucinations of Cooks have not stopped. Realizing he will never be free of his guilt, Miller decides to inject himself with a lethal dose of fentanyl. Cooks watches Miller as he sticks the syringe full of fentanyl in his vein. Cooks grabs Miller’s arm to stop him but when Miller looks up, Cooks is nowhere to be seen. Miller looks back down at the syringe in his hand, unsure whether to inject himself or not.

== Cast ==
- Gurj Gill as Miller / Danny
- Jason Adam as Cooks
- Nisaro Karim as Imran
- James Jaysen Bryhan as Collins
- Joe Egan as Neil

== Production ==
Bluff was written, directed, filmed, edited and produced by Sheikh Shahnawaz as his feature directorial debut. Shahnawaz had finished writing the screenplay just 5 days before his father died. He went into production a month later to finish the film in honor of his father's memory. Shahnawaz was inspired by issues in his hometown:

This is a deeply personal film for me. Not only because of having to deal with my father's death while making it but also because it was set in my hometown and deals with homelessness and the illicit trade of heroin which is a prevalent issue here. I spent time with actual heroin users and drug dealers for research. The undercover policing tactics depicted in the film are based on real-life experiences of actual undercover police agents that operated in this region.

Sheikh produced Bluff for a final production budget of $2,000. He did this by filming completely guerilla as a one-man crew with locally-based actors in his hometown of Birmingham, England:

I was forced to make this film with only my own resources because as a 26-year-old filmmaker, a child of 2 Bangladeshi Muslim immigrants, from the inner-city of Birmingham, nobody in the UK film industry would give me a mainstream opportunity. Inspired by the debut micro-budget films of Christopher Nolan, Damien Chazelle, Barry Jenkins, Richard Linklater, Robert Rodriguez and Darren Aronofsky, I wasn’t going to let anything stop me from making this film.

The last 25% of the production was filmed after a 6-month hiatus in 2020 once COVID-19 lockdown measures had eased.

== Release ==
Bluff was released for digital download on 28 April 2022.

== Reception ==
On review aggregator Rotten Tomatoes, Bluff has an approval rating of 83% based on 6 reviews. Cath Clarke from The Guardian said: "It's not without flaws but Shahnawaz is clearly ambitious and does well on what looks like a minuscule budget". Michael Talbot-Haynes from Film Threat gave it a good review, writing: "The movie is an excellent opiate opera with fantastic performances by a needle-sharp cast".
