= Night Train (novel) =

Novel by Martin Amis

- First edition
- Author: Martin Amis
- Language: English
- Genre: Detective fiction, parody
- Publisher: Jonathan Cape
- Publication date: 2 October 1997
- Publication place: United Kingdom
- Media type: Print (hardcover)
- Pages: 175
- ISBN: 0-224-05018-4
- OCLC: 37778888
- Dewey Decimal: 823/.914 21
- LC Class: PR6051.M5 N5 1997

Night Train (1997) is a comedic parody of American detective novels by the author Martin Amis, named after the song "Night Train", which features twice in the novel.

== Plot summary ==
This book is told from the perspective of Detective Mike Hoolihan, a female detective who is charged with the task of finding the motivation for Jennifer Rockwell's suicide (she shot herself in the head three times, supposedly). Jennifer, a beautiful astrophysicist with a seemingly perfect life, seems to have had no reason to kill herself. Thematically, the book touches on cosmology and chaos theory, and their relation to the human condition as a possible motive for suicide.

Hoolihan is a recovering alcoholic and former homicide detective who lives with an obese man named Tobe in an unnamed American city. She reveals that she had been sexually abused as a child, revolted violently against the abuse at the age of ten, and then pursued a number of affairs with abusive or unworthy men. Despite her disadvantages, she becomes a successful detective before her illness forces her to accept less demanding work seizing assets from criminals. Her experiences lead her to examine gender roles in police work.

Her former boss, mentor and personal friend "Colonel" Tom Rockwell, asks her to investigate the apparent suicide of his daughter Jennifer who, as a beautiful, intelligent, cheerful, popular woman, had no obvious reason for taking her own life. Rockwell suspects Jennifer's lover Trader Faulkner, a distinguished academic, of murdering Jennifer. Hoolihan attempts to pressure Faulkner into confessing, but fails. She discovers that Jennifer was taking lithium, met a philandering salesman in the bar of a local hotel, and made uncharacteristic mistakes at work shortly before her death. Hoolihan then deduces that these factors are merely "blinds" - or clues - deliberately planted by Jennifer for the benefit of an investigation at the behest of her father. Hoolihan concludes that these blinds are meant either to provide the less astute investigator with a sense of "closure", or to indicate a greater bleakness, or nihilism. After breaking down while attempting to communicate her findings to Rockwell - who immediately expresses his concern - Hoolihan heads for the nearest bar, knowing that the alcohol will kill her.

== Film ==
The novel was adapted into the 2018 film Out of Blue, written and directed by Carol Morley and starring Patricia Clarkson.
