= Lauren McCrostie =

British actress

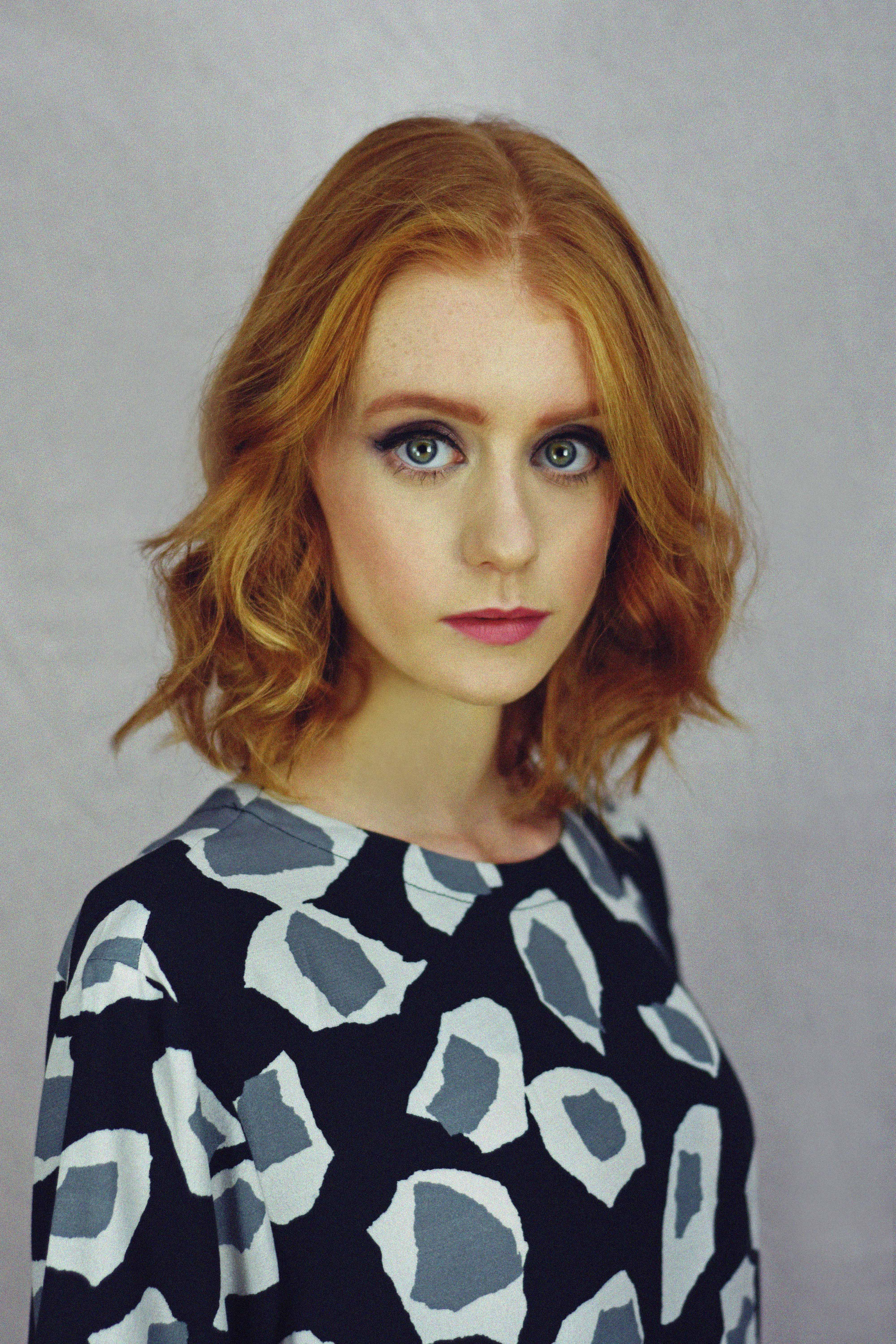
- Lauren McCrostie in 2016
- Born: 10 January 1996 (age 30); Lambeth, London, United Kingdom
- Known for: Actor, designer and advocate of ethical and sustainable products
- Notable work: Miss Peregrine's Home for Peculiar Children; The Falling

Lauren Paige McCrostie is a British actress. She appeared in Miss Peregrine's Home for Peculiar Children, The Falling and short films Second Skin and Brothers.

== Career ==
McCrostie attended Dulwich Village Infants' School, Dulwich Hamlet, The Charter School and St Marylebone School. McCrostie always had a passion for performing and as a child she would persuade her younger sister to perform with her and put on shows for their parents. McCrostie made her film debut when she auditioned for Carol Morley's film The Falling. Although McCrostie had no formal drama training, she was later cast as the character Gwen in Morley's film, alongside Maisie Williams, Florence Pugh and Greta Scacchi. After her role in The Falling, McCrostie hired an acting agent who secured auditions for appearances in short films and another with Tim Burton. Following an audition and meeting with Burton, McCrostie was cast as Olive Abroholos Elephanta in the film Miss Peregrine's Home for Peculiar Children, alongside Eva Green, Asa Butterfield, Ella Purnell and Samuel L. Jackson. In between her earlier acting jobs, McCrostie was waitressing at a cafe and went to drama classes at the Actors Centre. McCrostie became the ambassador for the Barnes Film Festival in 2017 which caters for young people looking for outlets to express their creativity in film and media.

== Activism ==
McCrostie is an advocate for ethical and sustainable living and she has created a small online website which sells products made from re-purposed materials that would have otherwise been thrown away. A costume designer who worked with McCrostie on a short film, initially inspired McCrostie to only buy clothing from charity and vintage shops. McCrostie later learned about the destructive effect the fashion industry has on the environment and to humans, so she felt motivated to continue buying second-hand clothing to promote the idea of conscious consumption. The documentary The True Cost also inspired McCrostie to promote sustainability in the fashion industry.

McCrostie maintains an environmentally-friendly and sustainable lifestyle, and encourages her family to shop package free and to reduce the amount of plastic they consume as a household.

In November 2017, McCrostie became an ambassador for the New York based environmental organisation called Earth Angel which endeavours to reduce waste and harm to the environment on the sets of film, television, commercials and special events.

== Personal life ==
McCrostie is a vegan. McCrostie's paternal grandfather was born in Scotland and both her parents are from Kenya. As of 2016, McCrostie was living with her mother, who was working in radio, and younger sister in Dulwich in the UK.

== Filmography ==
=== Film ===
Year	Title	Role	Notes
2014	The Falling	Gwen	
2015	Brothers	Rachel	Short film
2016	School Girls	Leila	Short film
2016	Second Skin	Lucy	Short film
2016	Miss Peregrine's Home for Peculiar Children	Olive Abroholos Elephanta	

=== Television ===
Year	Title	Role	Notes
2020	Acting for a Cause	Mustardseed/Snug	1 episode

=== Theatre ===
Year	Title	Role	Notes
2014	Bugsy Malone	Tallulah	Actor
2014	Macbeth	Ross	Actor
2015	Spring Awakening	Thea	Actor
2015	Macbeth	Malcolm	Actor
2015	Synergy	Peculiar	Actor
