= Audrey Amiss =

English artist

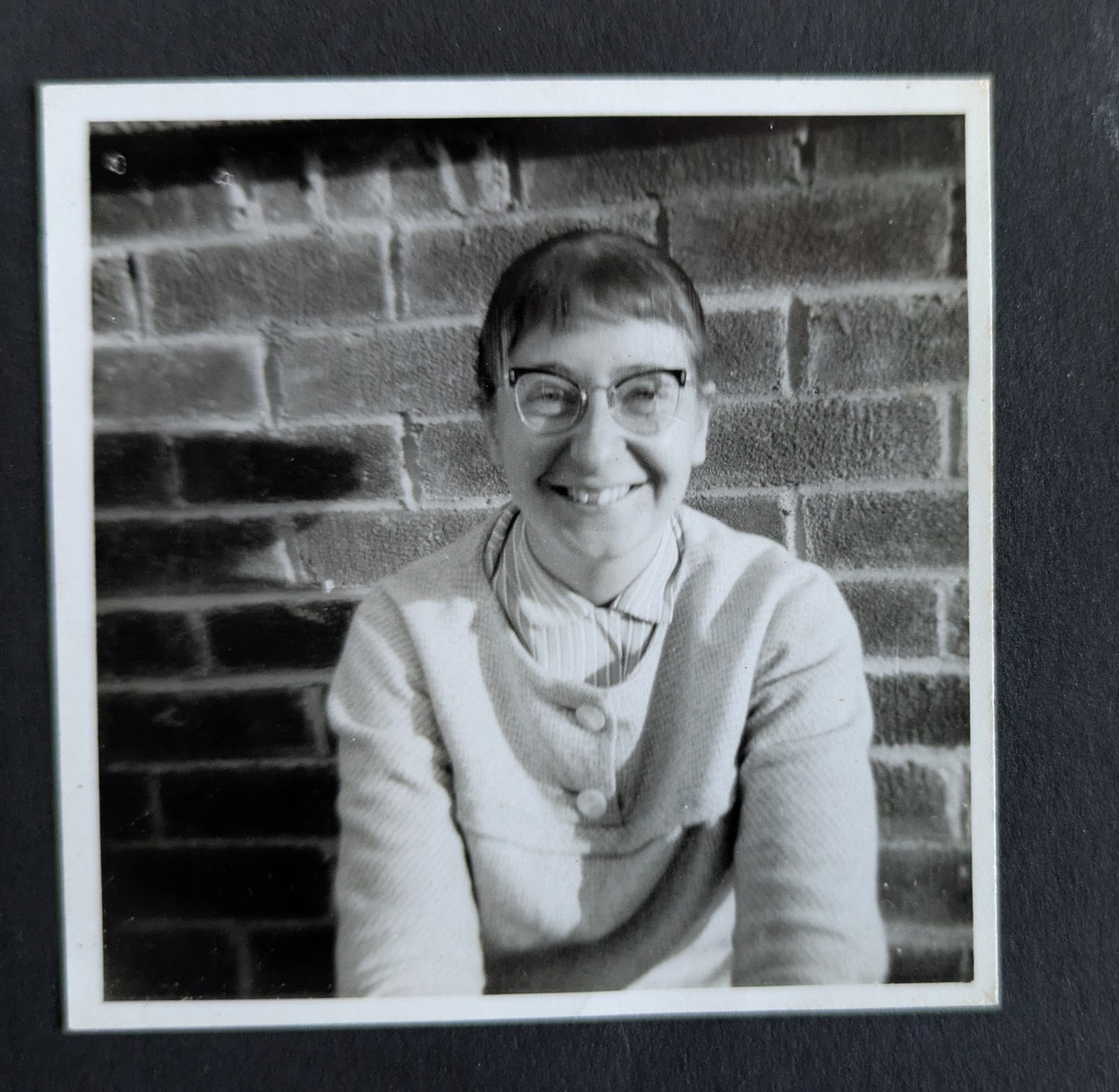
- Audrey Amiss. Family archive
- Born: Audrey Amiss; 28 October 1933; Sunderland, England
- Died: 10 July 2013 (aged 79); Clapham, London, England
- Occupation: Artist

Audrey Joan Amiss (1933–2013) was a British artist, whose art was re-discovered and recognised after her death in 2013. During her lifetime, Amiss was not well known as an artist and spent large periods of her life in psychiatric hospitals and units, often against her will and following arrest for civil disturbance. A feature film inspired by Amiss' life, Typist Artist Pirate King, was written and directed by Carol Morley, and had its UK premiere in March 2023 at Glasgow Film Festival.

== Art ==
Audrey Amiss formally trained as an artist, studying at the Royal Academy between 1954 and 1958. While she did not complete her art training due to mental illness, Amiss continued to create art throughout her life.

Amiss' art "allows a bewildering glimpse into the life of a woman wholly preoccupied with artmaking, collecting, and recording." Amiss was prolific in her artistic output, and is known to have created hundreds of sketches, paintings and other artworks over the course of her life. Much of this work was not seen publicly; while Amiss entered her work for submission in exhibitions and prizes or showed work at open exhibitions, she often expressed frustration at the formal art scene and her lack of recognition as an artist. On having an artwork rejected by an art society, Amiss wrote to her sister: 'I was once in the tradition of social realism, also called the kitchen sink school of painting. But I am now avant-garde and misunderstood.'

Amiss described her work as "a visual diary", and her drawings and paintings took their subject matter from the world around her, including still life, landscapes, local scenes, portraits, figures and objects. Amiss also meticulously recorded and itemised details of her daily life in a series of journals, log books, account books, record books, photo albums and scrapbooks. Each of these series of volumes was used for a defined purpose, from recording summaries of letters sent (record books), money spent and received (account books), log books (diary-type daily entries), and scrapbooks and photo albums (food eaten, junk mail and collected ephemera).

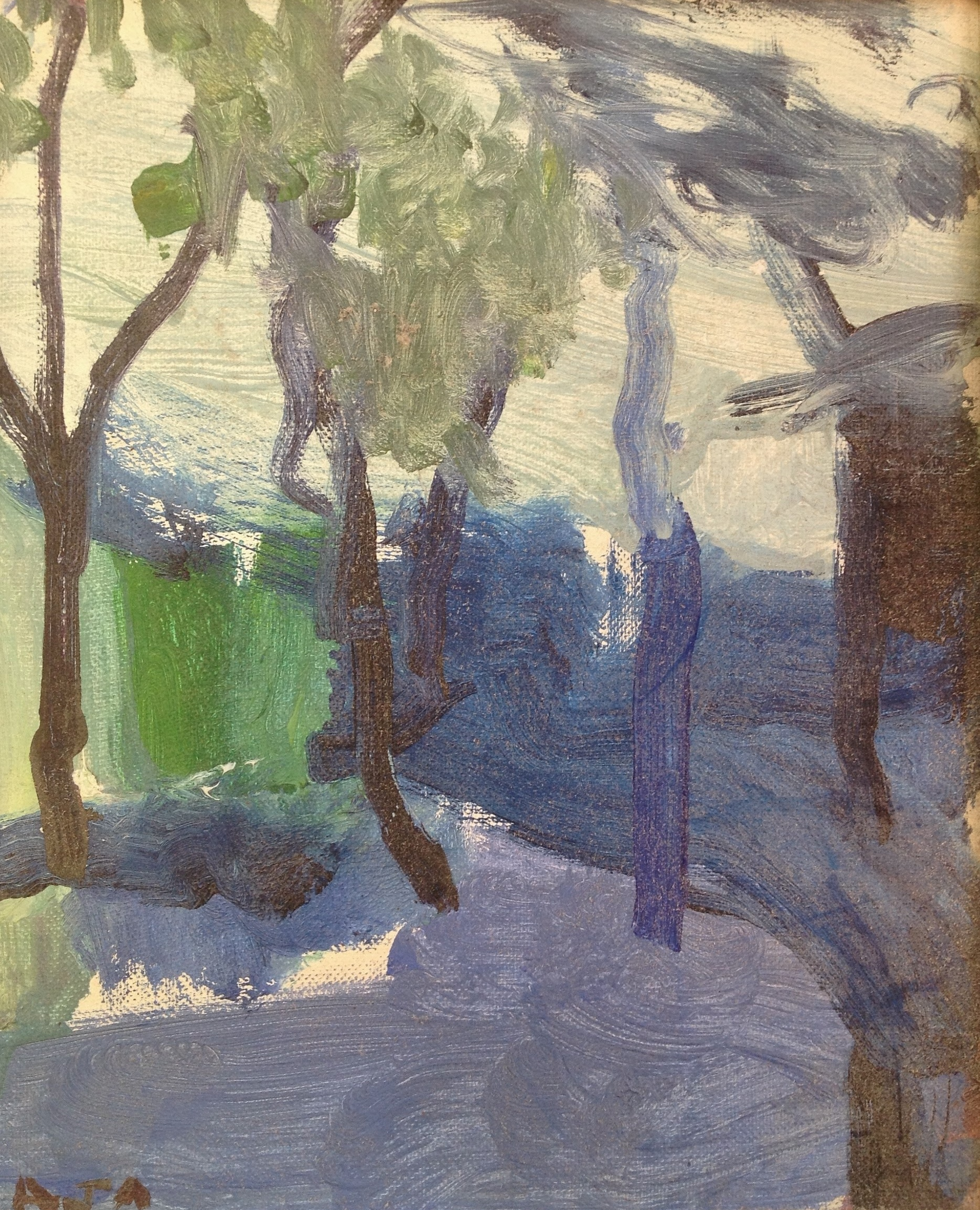
Trees in Amiss's Clapham neighbourhood (1980s)

Amiss' artwork is thematically rooted in the real world, with works taking their subject matter from her surroundings, including people, street scenes, objects, landscapes, and nature. She described herself as 'an artist, recording all my life the things I see around me'. The style of Amiss' art varies, with earlier works favouring more naturalistic renditions and use of oil, gouache, and pastels, whereas later works are more abstract and gestural, and tend to use pencil or pen, as well as block colour compositions in paint. Earlier portfolio works show Amiss experimenting with texture and architecture studies, different styles and techniques, and print-making.

Amiss' later sketches and paintings are characterised by their hasty composition, with numerous sketches composed in quick succession (for example, entire volumes from a day at London Zoo, observing traffic in Oxford Circus, or from a single life drawing class). Amiss dated and annotated virtually all of her drawings with their subject matter and date.

Amiss also created compositional works using found material such as junk mail, food packaging and newspaper cuttings, which were pasted into scrapbooks.

== Personal life ==
Amiss was born and grew up in Sunderland with her parents, Arthur and Isabelle (Belle) and sister, Dorothy. As a child, Amiss attended Bede Grammar School for Girls, where teachers noticed her artistic capabilities. After school, Amiss went on to attend the Sunderland College of Art, before winning a scholarship to the Royal Academy School of Art in London in 1954. Amiss studied painting at the Royal Academy, but withdrew from her studies in 1958, following what she described as her first breakdown with manic depression and incarceration at Warlingham Park Hospital. After her time as an in-patient, she did not return to the Royal Academy. Instead, Amiss trained as a shorthand typist, and worked as a typist for the Ministry of Labour from 1962, and later at Stockwell Unemployment Benefit Office, where she varied her hours of work in periods of poor or unstable mental health. For most of her adult life, Amiss lived in South London, in Clapham, with her mother Belle, who had sold the family shop in Sunderland to be nearer to her daughter. Belle died in 1989, after which time Amiss lived alone in the flat in Clapham, until her death in 2013, though her family maintained contact and provided her with support.

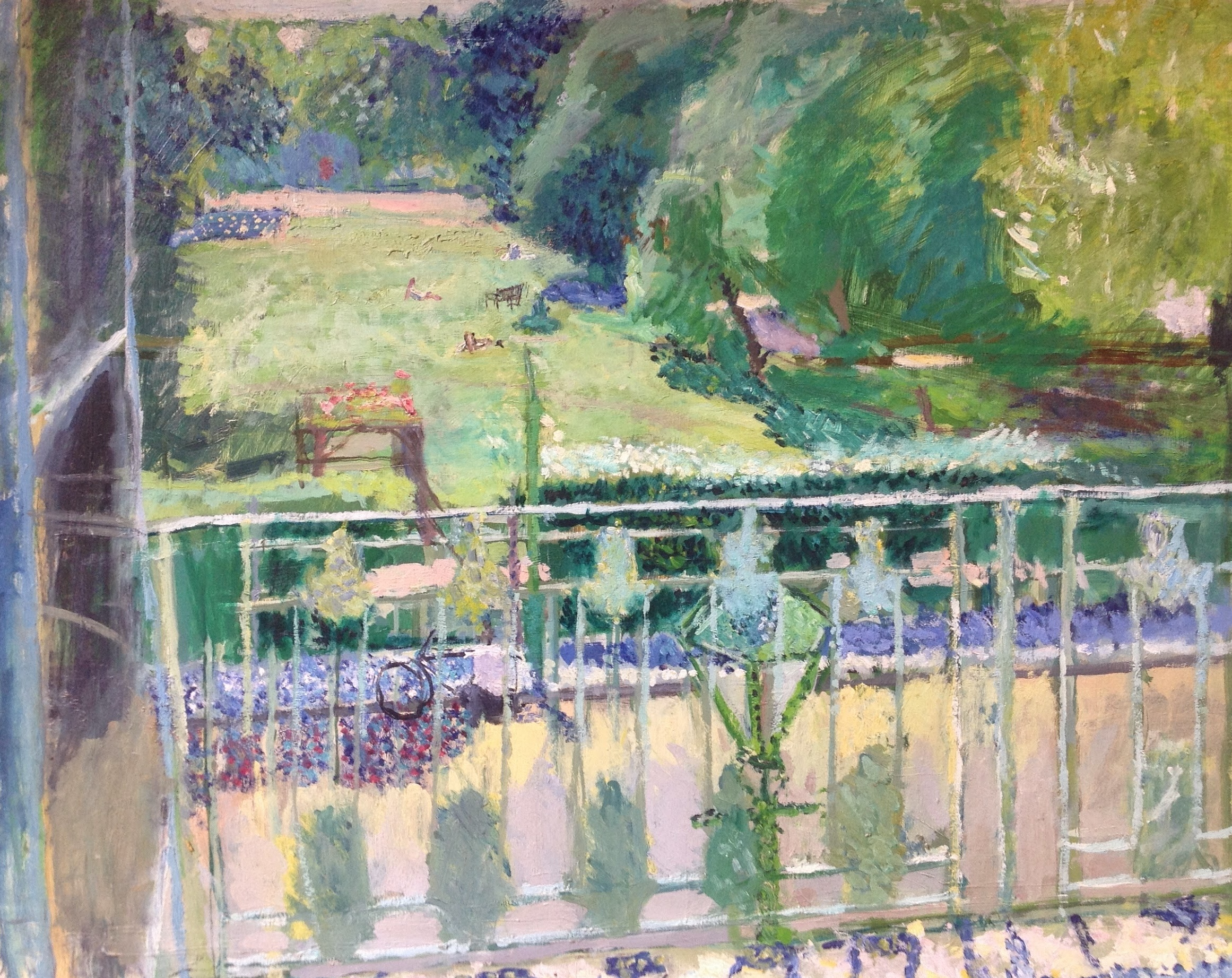
View from Amiss's student lodgings (1950s)

Amiss was a keen traveller, and went on numerous holidays abroad, both as a solo traveller on package holidays or with her mother. These included holidays to Syria, South America, Russia, Egypt, India and Nepal, Vietnam and China. When visiting China in the 1980s, Amiss was restrained and arrested, returned to England and sectioned at Tooting Bec Hospital.

From 1977, Amiss began assembling photographs and other found materials (mostly newspaper cuttings and unsolicited post or junk mail) into photograph albums. Amiss' photographs were mostly from her holidays and travels, visits to London Zoo and local scenes and objects. Volumes also included cuttings from newspapers, junk mail and other ephemeral material, including some food packaging. From the late 1990s, Amiss shifted to using mostly lined A4 refill pads instead of photograph albums, which were mainly filled with food packaging and associated everyday ephemera (including envelopes, letters, newspaper and magazine cuttings, and packaging from household goods). Amiss added commentary and contextual information to these items, such as where and when the item was purchased, associations to the design, and how it tasted, as well as longer-form associations and thoughts arising from the items. According to a family member, Amiss began documenting the food she ate in scrapbooks following a Health Visitor's advice to track her diet. 234 volumes of photograph albums and scrapbooks were found in Amiss' home dating from 1977 to 2013.

Amiss also recorded money she spent and received, keeping a log of all her receipts and encounters in shops in a series of account books. These books include pasted and handwritten receipts in chronological order, annotated with Amiss' commentary on the finances and money tendered, as well as recording details of her shopping experiences. Amiss also collected and stuck down bank and pension statements, postal orders, tickets, envelopes and letters, appointment cards, and sometimes food packaging within these volumes. 47 volumes of account books were found in Amiss' home dating from 1996 to 2013.

Amiss was also an avid letter writer, writing an average of eight letters a day to various people and organisations, including MPs and public figures, charities, newspapers, companies, banks, building societies, friends and family. Amiss recorded details of the letters she sent in a series of record books, which itemise each letter sent, with the recipient's name and address, a summary of the contents of the letter, the method of delivery, and other details of interest to her. 37 volumes of record books were found in Amiss' home dating from 1992 to 2001.

Amiss died in 2013 at the age of 79, having lived in semi-reclusive lifestyle in her later years. When her family cleared the home, they discovered hundreds of sketchbooks, scrapbooks, photograph albums, account books, record books and log books, spanning from Amiss's early life up until the day of her death on 10 July 2013. The sketchbooks alone contain an estimated 50,000 individual sketches, with Amiss often filling entire volumes in one sitting or over the course of a single day.

In 2014, Amiss' family donated the collection in its entirety to Wellcome Collection, a library and museum in London which focuses on human health and medicine.

=== Mental health ===
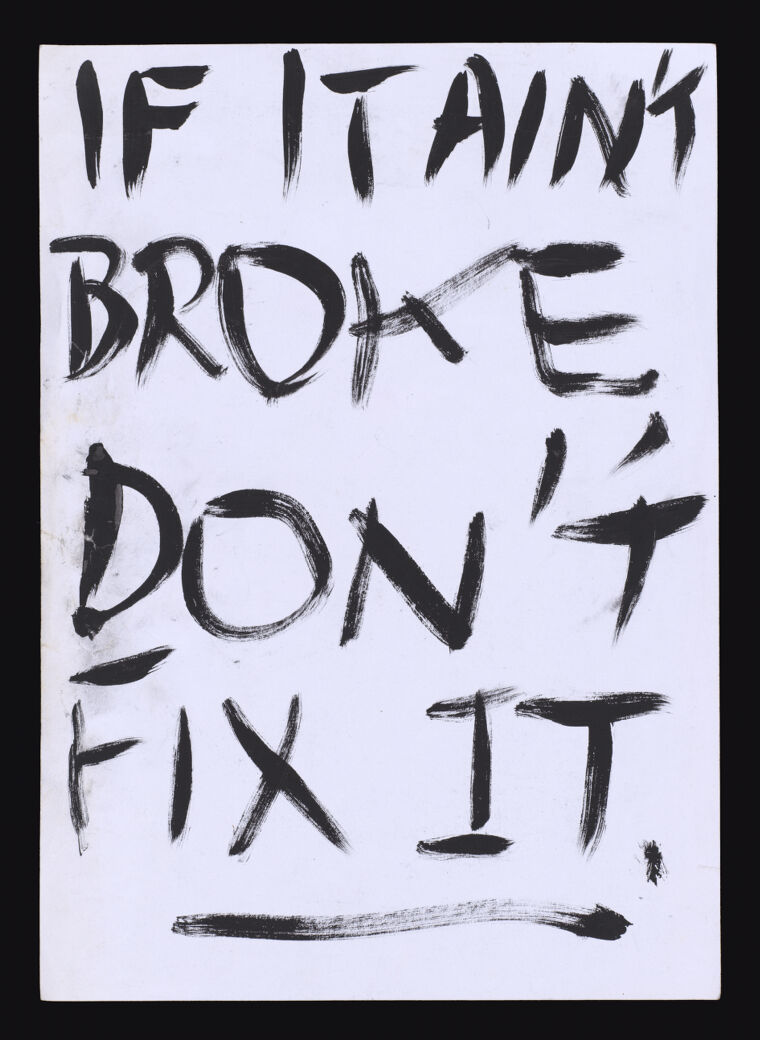
Protest poster which Amiss both used and exhibited (2002)

Over the course of her life, Amiss was admitted to psychiatric hospitals on numerous occasions and diagnosed with a number of mental health conditions, including paranoid schizophrenia and bipolar disorder. Amiss was often opposed to medical intervention and did not want to be in hospital or on medication. Amiss spent time in a number of psychiatric units over the years, and was sectioned in both open and locked wards at Ryhope General Hospital (now Hopewood Park Hospital), Cherry Knowle, Warlingham Park Hospital, Tooting Bec Hospital, South Western Hospital (Nelson Ward), Charles Clinic Chelsea, South London and Maudsley and Elizabeth Ward (St Thomas' Hospital). Amiss' time in hospitals was often the result of altercations in public and involved police arrests for civil disturbance. In 2000s, Amiss launched an appeal to the Mental Health Review Tribunal which was eventually unsuccessful.

Amiss described herself as a Mental Health Survivor and was involved with local mental health groups and survivor networks. She wrote frequent letters about her sense of mistreatment in hospitals, and her distrust of medical institutions and doctors. Amiss is known to have attended several mental health demonstrations, and organised an exhibition in 2002 titled Drawings from a Locked Ward ('The Snakepit'). She also exhibited painted signs with slogans including "Justice for Lunatics"; "If it Ain't Broke Don't Fix It"; "Stop Psychiatric Oppression".

== Legacy and popular culture ==
During her lifetime, Amiss organised at least six solo exhibitions and participated in many group shows, including the Royal Academy's Summer Exhibitions in the 1950s. In July 2026, Audrey Amiss: The Surviving Exhibitions, opened at Wellcome Collection. Based on extensive research in Wellcome's Audrey Amiss archive, it reconstructed her six known shows as completely as possible.

Audrey Amiss' life is the subject of a feature-length film, Typist Artist Pirate King, written and directed by BAFTA-nominated film maker Carol Morley and produced by Cairo Cannon, which was filmed in November 2021. The film imagines a road trip of Amiss and a psychiatric nurse. The film was made following Carol Morley's time as a Screenwriting Fellow at Wellcome Trust from 2015, where she encountered Amiss' archive and undertook research to develop the film.

The film is financed by the BFI, BCP Asset Management, MBK Productions, LipSync and Genesis Entertainment, with support from Wellcome and development financing from BBC Films and the BFI. The film had its international premiere at Tallinn Black Nights Film Festival in 2022, and had its UK Premiere at Glasgow Film Festival in March 2023.

== Archive and art collection ==
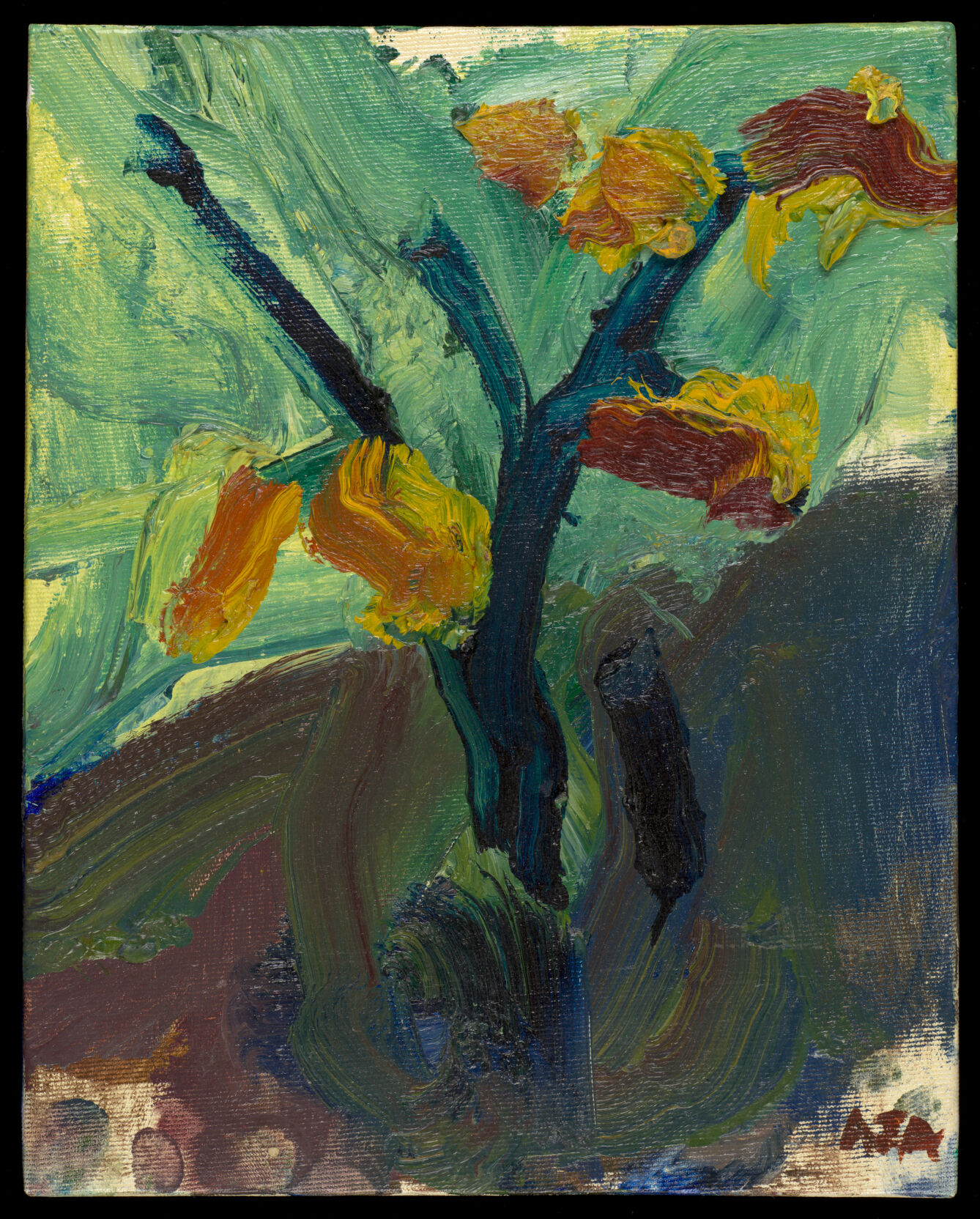
Painting of daffodils Amiss exhibited in 1986, shown again at Wellcome in 2026

Audrey Amiss' archive and artworks were donated by her family to Wellcome Collection in 2014. The archive has the archive reference PP/AMI.

The archive contains material created by Amiss over the course of her life, as found by Amiss's family after her death.

The collection includes:

- Sketchbooks (854 volumes, 1950s – July 2013)
- Artworks (152 paintings, 136 prints, 91 drawings, 13 folders, 2 embroideries and 1 volume)
- Photo albums and Scrapbooks (234 volumes, 1950s – July 2013)
- Account books (47 volumes, Feb 1996 – July 2013)
- Record books (37 volumes, Apr 1992 – July 2013)
- Log books (16 volumes, Apr 1999 – July 2013)
- Personal and family papers (2 boxes, 1940s – 2013)
- Letters from Dorothy Amiss to Audrey Amiss (1986–2013)

The Audrey Amiss Archive has now been fully catalogued and is available for research by requesting items via the online catalogue. The collection is freely available for all library members at Wellcome Collection to view onsite in the Collection's library.

The exhibition "Kitchen Sink Realism" is on display at the Northern Gallery for Contemporary Art's Sunderland Culture House.
