= Dreams of a Life =

- Theatrical release poster
- Directed by: Carol Morley
- Written by: Carol Morley
- Produced by: Cairo Cannon
- Starring: Zawe Ashton
- Distributed by: Dogwoof Pictures
- Release date: 16 December 2011 (UK)
- Running time: 95 minutes
- Countries: United Kingdom; Ireland
- Language: English
- Box office: £187,513

Dreams of a Life is a 2011 drama-documentary film, released by Dogwoof Pictures, directed by Carol Morley and starring Zawe Ashton as Joyce Carol Vincent, a London woman whose remains were discovered in her home in 2006, just over two years after she had died.

== Plot ==
The film tells the story of Joyce Vincent, whose skeletal remains were found in her flat in Wood Green, North London, in January 2006. Joyce was found surrounded by wrapped Christmas gifts and with her TV still switched on, having remained undiscovered since December 2003. Due to advanced decomposition, the cause of death could not be determined.

The film features interviews with various friends, acquaintances, former partners and individuals involved in the developing news story, including Vincent's MP, Lynne Featherstone, in an attempt to tell the story of Joyce, who is played in reconstructions by Ashton. Vincent's father is played by Cornell John.

The film confronts issues such as loneliness, even while living in one of the busiest cities, how loss of contact with family and friends can cause no one to notice a missing relative or friend, and how a body can go unnoticed in a room feet away from a busy street, without repercussions from unpaid rent and utilities.

== Production ==
Director Carol Morley was inspired to make the documentary on Joyce's life after reading an article in a tabloid newspaper which she found discarded on the London Underground, which while describing Vincent failed to mention her age, race or any detailed information. She spent the next five years tracking down interviewees by taking out ads in newspapers, and hiring a cab to drive around London bearing a poster asking people to contact her if they knew Joyce.

She was surprised to learn that many of the respondents did not know Joyce was dead until she spoke to them even though some of them remembered hearing of her death when it was reported on in newspapers. One of the first respondents to Morley's advert was Martin, who features prominently in the film, an ex-partner and one-time close friend who was able to provide photographs for Morley. Martin then put her in touch with other friends, including an ex-landlord, ex-partner and friend who had recorded her singing in his studio.

Morley was criticised for an extended fictionalised sequence that featured Zawe Ashton as Joyce performing the song "A Smile is Just a Frown". She stated that she was inspired to keep the sequence in the film by a similar sequence in Agnès Varda's Cléo from 5 to 7 and also credited Varda's documentary work with inspiring much of her movie.

Morley was also in contact with Joyce's four sisters, all of whom refused to be in the film. Although they asked Morley not to make the film, she went ahead with production, but gave them an advance screening in order to show that she had been respectful in remembering their sister.

== Reception ==
On Rotten Tomatoes, the film has a rating of 76% based on 29 reviews. On Metacritic the film has a score of 62% based on reviews from 10 critics, indicating "generally favorable reviews".

The Guardian described it as "empathic, brave, clever, haunting", while The New York Times reflected on the frustrating nature of the story only half told. The Telegraph described the film as a "tender, thoughtful and celebratory homage to Vincent's life".

In 2013, Ashton won a Screen Nation Award for Female Performance in a Film 2012/2013, in recognition of her lead-role performance in Dreams of a Life.

=== In popular culture ===
Steven Wilson's album Hand. Cannot. Erase. was inspired by his viewing of the film.

Paloma Faith's song "Lost and Lonely" from the album The Architect was written and recorded in response to seeing Dreams of a Life.
