= Tooting Bec Hospital =

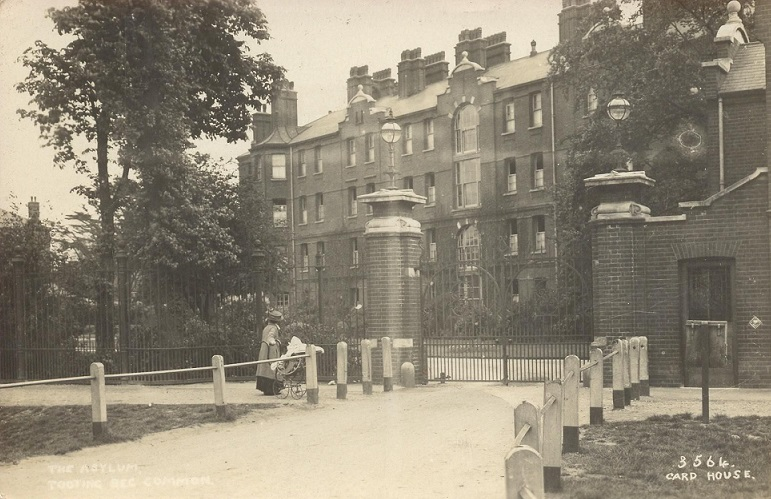
- Tooting Bec Hospital

- Shown in Wandsworth

Geography
- Location: Tooting Bec, London, England
- Coordinates: 51.4307°N 0.1514°W

Organisation
- Care system: NHS
- Type: Specialist

Services
- Emergency department: N/A
- Speciality: Psychiatric Hospital

History
- Founded: 1903
- Closed: 1995

Links
- Lists: Hospitals in England

Tooting Bec Hospital was a mental facility in Tooting Bec, London, England.

== History ==
This facility was one of the establishments commissioned by the Metropolitan Asylums Board to deal with chronic cases. The 22-acre site had previously been part of the Tooting Lodge Estate. The hospital, which was designed by Arthur and Christopher Harston using a dual pavilion layout (as had previously been used in the Chatham and Leavesden asylums), was built at a cost of £200,000 and opened as the Tooting Bec Asylum in January 1903.

Seven ward blocks had been built at the time of opening and a further two had been added by 1906.

The facility was expanded from 1914 which involved demolishing Bushey Down House, a mansion to the south west of the site. The additional buildings were completed by 1925, doubling the original capacity from 1100 to 2200 patients.

It became Tooting Bec Mental Hospital in 1924 and was used exclusively for patients with senile dementia. In 1930 it came under the control of London County Council and in 1937 was renamed Tooting Bec Hospital. After suffering some bomb damage during the Second World War, it joined the National Health Service in 1948. After the introduction of Care in the Community in the early 1980s, the hospital went into a period of decline and closed in July 1995. The buildings were subsequently demolished from 1996-7 and the site redeveloped by Fairview Homes for residential use as "Heritage Park". Services were transferred to St Thomas Hospital. A twenty metre stretch of the original wall remains in the northwest corner of the housing estate.
