= Carol Morley =

English film director (born 1966)

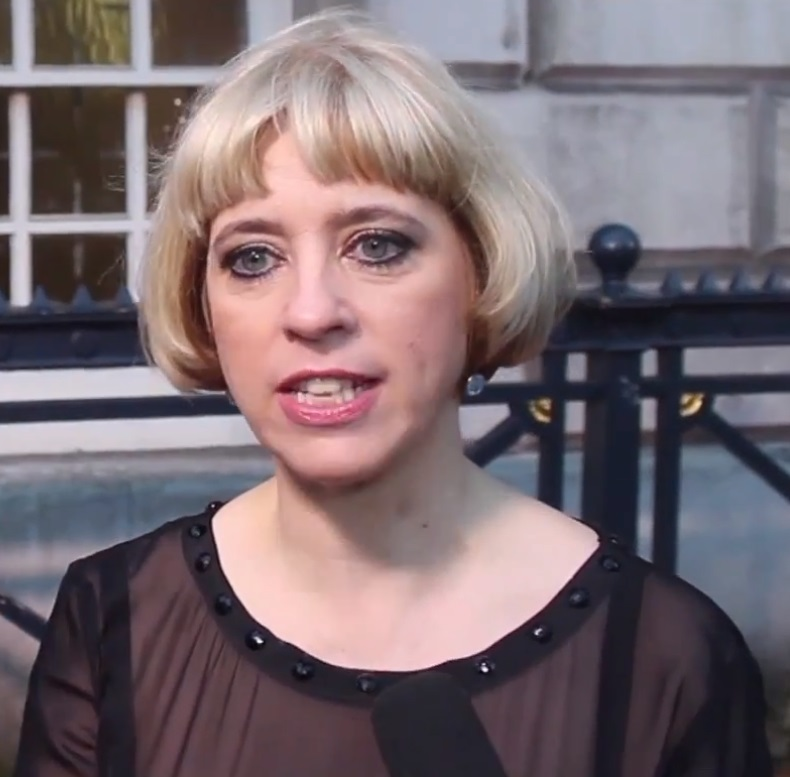
- Morley at the 58th BFI London Film Festival Awards in October 2014
- Born: Carol Anne Morley; 14 January 1966 (age 60); Stockport, Cheshire, England
- Occupations: Director; producer; screenwriter
- Years active: 1993–present

Carol Anne Morley (born 14 January 1966) is an English film director, screenwriter and producer. She is best known for her semi-documentary Dreams of a Life, released in 2011, about Joyce Carol Vincent, who died in her North London bedsit in 2003, but was not discovered until 2006.

Her older brother is the music journalist, critic and producer Paul Morley.

== Early life ==
Born in Stockport, Greater Manchester, Morley left school at the age of sixteen to be a singer in various bands. When she was thirteen she was in a band called The Playground, and later she was part of a band called TOT.

Morley's father died by suicide when she was eleven and at the age of twelve she started drinking alcohol. After a traumatic experience due to alcohol Morley stopped drinking until she was sixteen. In 1982, the same year Morley left school, the nightclub The Haçienda opened in Manchester. Morley spent a lot of time at the Haçienda until she was 21 and left Manchester.

Somewhere in between 1986 and 1987, Morley left Stockport and Manchester to live in London. She decided to attend Central Saint Martins College of Art and Design where she studied fine art film. Morley graduated from Central Saint Martins in 1993 with an honours degree in fine art film and video. She did not return to Manchester for twelve years and when she did it was to make her documentary The Alcohol Years.

== Career ==
Morley has written and directed a total of 12 films from 1993 to 2011, ranging in length from 3 minutes to 93 minutes. Morley made two-degree films at Central Saint Martins, one of which is called Girl. Shot with 16mm film, this short film uses cross-cutting and devices of the genre melodrama to create a feeling of conflict and crisis. The other degree film was Secondhand Daylight which was set in a fast food restaurant, and in which a group of young people talked about their problems. It too was shot on 16 mm film.

I'm Not Here was inspired by the letter Alec Guinness wrote to The Times in which he complained about how little attention customers got in shops. The film concerns boredom and shop assistants. In the short film The Week Elvis Died (15 mins), written and directed by Morley, we see 11-year-old Karen (played by Jennifer Williams) meet Tony Blackburn, played by Blackburn himself. Also shot on 16mm film.

During her years at Saint Martins her feature debut film, The Alcohol Years, began to take shape. It is a documentary based on her years as a troubled youth (age 16-21) during the early eighties in Manchester, in which she spent a lot of her time in the Hacienda. Five years of her life were lost due to heavy drinking and in the documentary Morley seeks to find out what really happened during this time by interviewing those she knew. It is directed and filmed by Morley and produced by Cairo Cannon, who produces Morley’s films. Together they own the company CAMP, Cannon and Morley Productions.

Everyday Something is a short film (14 mins) from 2001 shot on 35mm. It is based on Morley's collection of newspaper cuttings and explores the unusual happenings in ordinary people's lives. In Return Trip (24 mins) Morley tracks down an old friend, Catherine Corcoran, and together they revisit India where they once travelled as teenagers. Stalin My Neighbour (15 mins) deals with Morley's obsession about missing people. The main character Annie is obsessed with local history but trying to forget her past. It was included on the same DVD as The Alcohol Years.

The Fear of Trilogy (3 mins) was filmed with a mobile phone and was shot and edited in one day. Her short film called The Madness of the Dance (18 mins) was finished in 2006. It looks into mass manias and individual obsessions like the "biting mania" and obsessive-compulsive disorders like trichotillomania.

Morley’s first fictional film Edge was released in 2010 and tells the story of six guests trapped at the Cliff Edge Hotel during winter.

In 2006 the remains of 38-year-old Joyce Carol Vincent were found in her apartment, three years after her death. This inspired Morley to make the docu-drama Dreams of a Life, where actress Zawe Ashton portrays Joyce Vincent.

She was a guest at the 4th annual Screen Stockport Film Festival, answering questions on her new film The Falling. Morley's young-adult novel 7 Miles Out was published in 2015.

In May 2017 it was announced that Morley would be directing Patricia Clarkson in Out of Blue, an adaptation of Martin Amis' Night Train. Shooting began in October in New Orleans, Louisiana. The film was released in 2018.

In 2021, filming began on Typist Artist Pirate King, a film written and directed by Morley based on the life of artist Audrey Amiss. The screenplay was written following Carol's extensive research on the Audrey Amiss archive at Wellcome Collection. The film features Monica Dolan, Kelly MacDonald, and Gina McKee, and is produced with long-time collaborator, Cairo Cannon, alongside Jane Campion, Anne Sheehan, Reno Antoniades and Ameenah Ayub Allen.

== Filmography ==
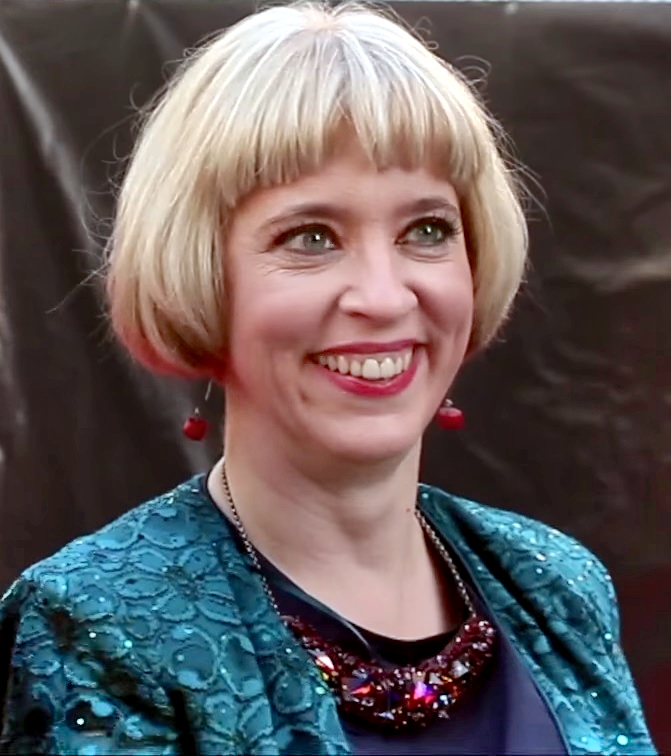
Carol Morley at The Falling Premiere 2014

Short film

- Girl (1993) – Graduation Film
- Secondhand Daylight (1993) – Graduation Film
- I'm Not Here (1994)
- The Week Elvis Died (1997)
- Everyday Something (2001)
- Return Trip (2001)
- Stalin My Neighbour (2004)
- The Fear of Trilogy (2006)
- The Madness of the Dance (2006)

Feature film

- The Alcohol Years (2000)
- Edge (2010)
- Dreams of a Life (2011)
- The Falling (2014)
- Out of Blue (2018)
- Typist Artist Pirate King (2023)
- 7 Miles Out (2026)

Editor

- True Blue Camper (1996)

Producer

- Forgotten Pilots (1999)

== Awards and nominations ==
=== I'm Not Here ===
- Winner of Gold Plaque Chicago International Film Festival

=== The Alcohol Years ===
- BAFTA nominated in the category Best New Director
- Winner of Best Short Documentary, Melbourne International Film Festival
- Winner of Special Grierson Award

=== Edge ===
- Selected for the London Film Festival in 2010
- Selected for the Shanghai International Film Festival in 2011

=== Dreams of a Life ===
- Nominated in the category Best Documentary, Grierson Award, London Film Festival
- Nominated in the category Best Documentary, London Critics Circle
- Nominated in the category Best Documentary, London Evening Standard Film Awards

=== The Falling ===
- Nominated at the London Film Festival with Florence Pugh and Carol Morley
