= Jo Hamilton (subpostmaster) =

British campaigner and former subpostmaster (born 1957)

Jo Hamilton OBE
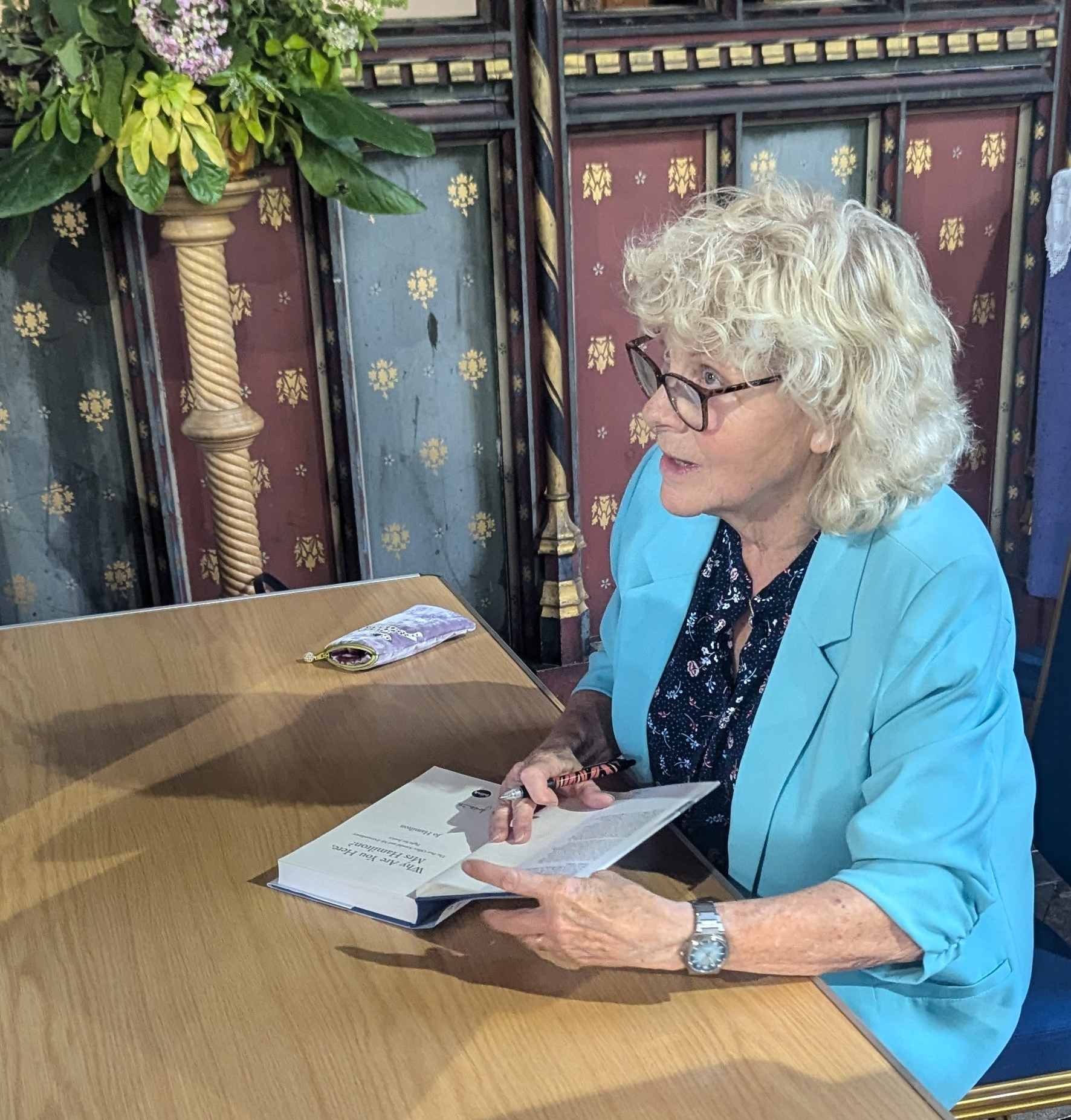
- Jo Hamilton in 2025, signing a copy of her memoir: Why Are You Here, Mrs Hamilton?
- Born: 1957 (age 68–69); Hampshire, England
- Occupation: Former subpostmaster
- Known for: Campaigner for justice for victims of the British Post Office scandal

Josephine "Jo" Hamilton OBE (born 1957) is a former subpostmaster and a campaigner for justice for victims of the British Post Office scandal. She ran a village post office in Hampshire from 2001 until 2006, when she was suspended and then wrongly prosecuted for shortfalls caused by the Post Office faulty accounting software, Horizon. She was convicted of false accounting, received a supervision order and had to pay the Post Office £36,000 although it was money she did not owe.

Her treatment at the hands of the Post Office had a devastating impact on her health, family and finances. She went on to be a founding member of the Justice for Subpostmasters Alliance (JFSA) and one of the 555 litigants in the successful group legal action of Bates & Others v Post Office Ltd. Her criminal conviction was overturned in April 2021. She was portrayed by Monica Dolan in the 2024 ITV drama Mr Bates vs The Post Office.

== Subpostmaster at South Warnborough ==
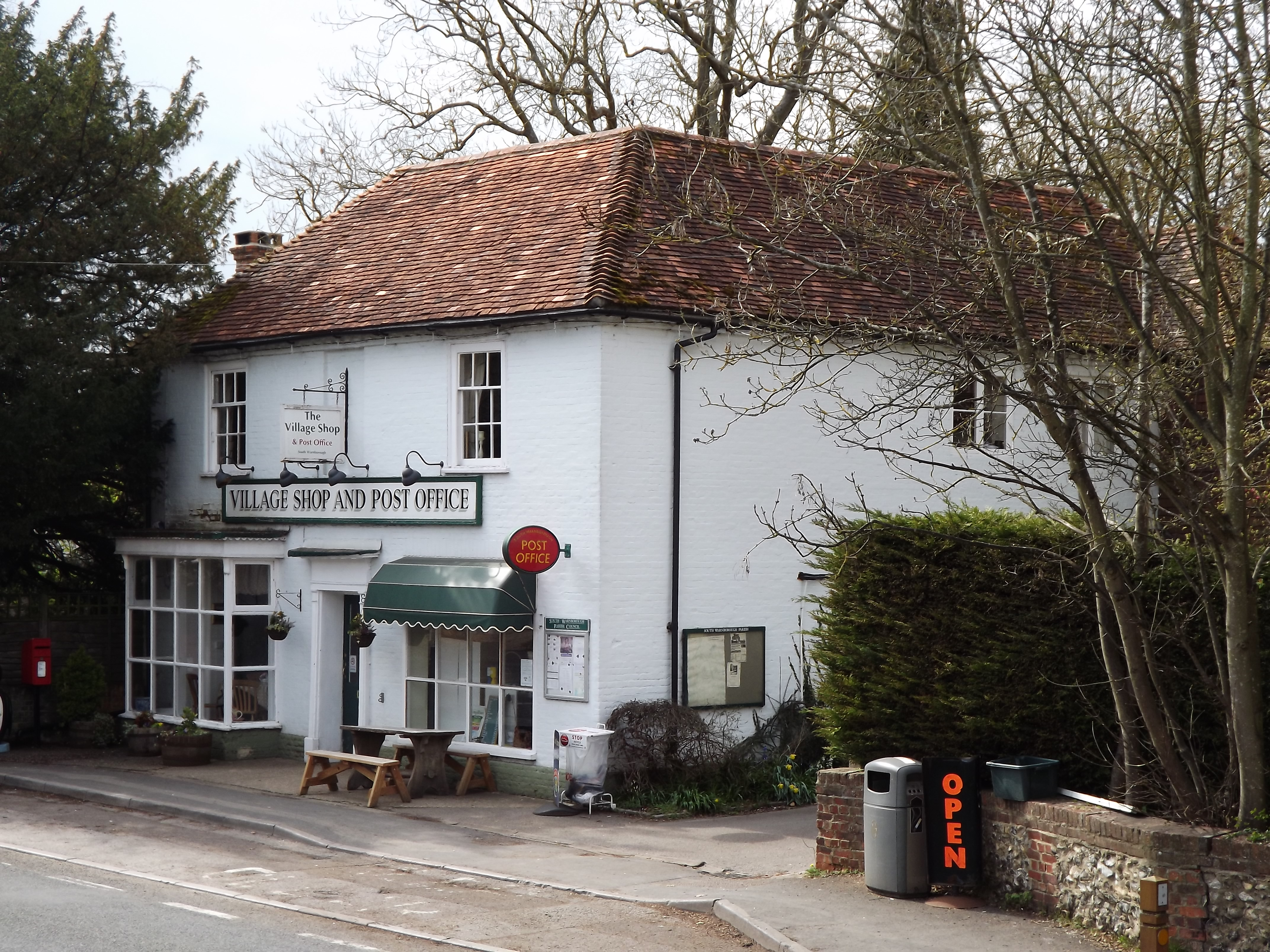
Hamilton's post office

Hamilton and her husband David moved to the village of South Warnborough in north-east Hampshire in 1985. During the 1990s they ran a haulage business but were winding the business down and looking for another opportunity when villagers suggested in 2001 that they should take over the running of the village shop, which included a post office counter. Hamilton and her husband set up a tearoom and delicatessen in the shop as well as selling groceries. The Post Office counter had a turnover of about £2,000 or £3,000 a week, mostly selling stamps and paying out pensions. Hamilton took over the management of Post Office counter at the end of 2001, formally becoming subpostmaster in October 2003. She received only a very minimal amount of training on the Post Office's new accounting system, Horizon. At first the system worked well, and it was only after the Post Office installed a chip-and-pin machine in 2003 that she began to experience discrepancies in her accounts. On one occasion she rang the Post Office helpline on finding a discrepancy of about £2,000 only to see it double while she followed instructions from the helpline operator. She was then told she was liable for the whole amount, which would be taken out of her salary.

== Conviction ==
As more discrepancies appeared, Hamilton was forced to make more payments from her salary. Although she called the helpline on multiple occasions, she was never told how the discrepancies might have occurred or how she could dispute them. As the amounts grew she remortgaged her house and borrowed money to cover them. By 2006, there was still a shortfall of £36,000 according to Post Office auditors and Hamilton was suspended.

Although the Post Office investigator had found no evidence that she had stolen money, the Post Office brought charges of theft. In November 2007, Hamilton took legal advice and pleaded guilty to a lesser offence of false accounting in the hope of avoiding a prison sentence. She remortgaged her house again in order to give the Post Office £36,000, a condition of having the theft charges dropped.

Hamilton was sentenced at Winchester Crown Court on 4 February 2008. She had more than 100 character references, including one from a retired judge, and more than 60 people turned up at court to support her. The local vicar testified that Hamilton was "kind, caring and the centre of the community". The judge gave Hamilton the minimum sentence of a 12-month supervision order. Although she had avoided a prison sentence, the criminal conviction would have a profound impact on her life and her family. She was unable to obtain regular employment or even to help at her granddaughter's school. Her police officer son had to declare his mother's conviction when he took on a new role.

== Campaigning begins ==
Although Hamilton had been told that she was the only person experiencing problems with Horizon, she was in fact one of hundreds of people prosecuted by the Post Office in similar circumstances. In 2008 she made contact with Alan Bates, who had set up a website for Horizon victims. Along with Bates, she was one of the seven former subpostmasters interviewed for an article in Computer Weekly that broke the news of the scandal in May 2009. Later that year she was one of the founding members of the Justice For Subpostmasters Association (JFSA) and attended the inaugural meeting in Fenny Compton village hall. In December 2009, Hamilton met with her MP, James Arbuthnot, who believed what she was saying and became the leader of a group of MPs whose constituents had had similar problems with Horizon.

== Group litigation ==
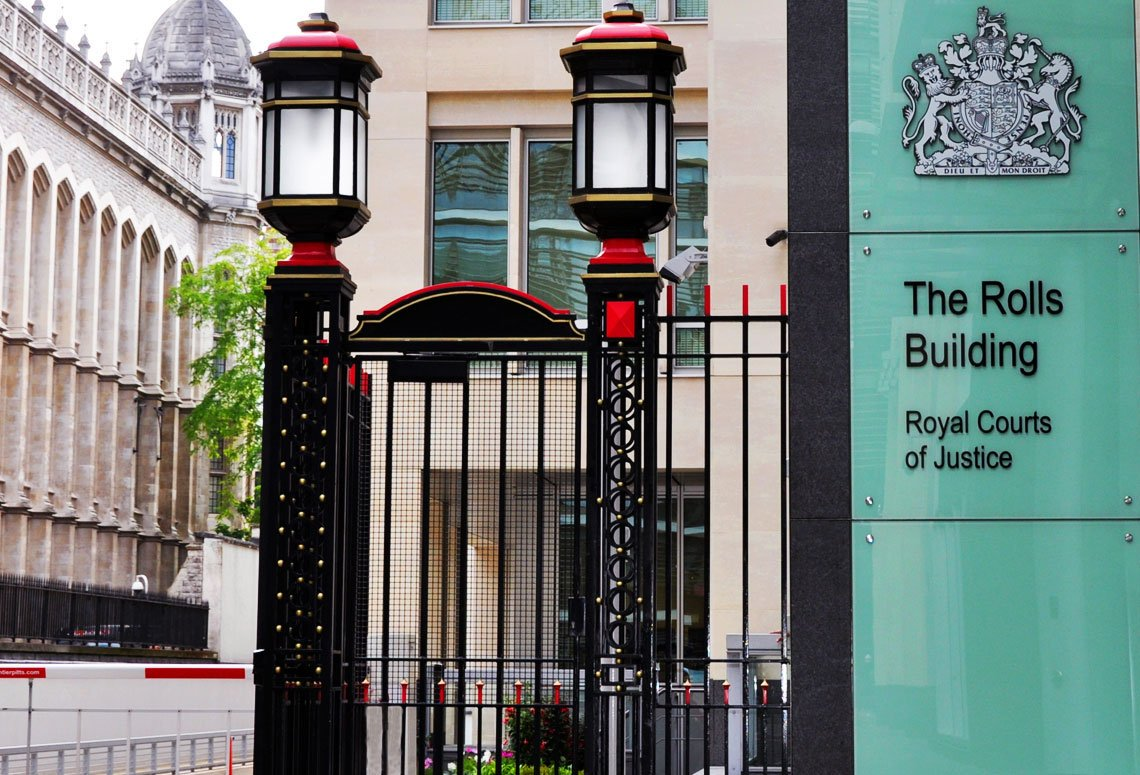
The case was heard at the Rolls Building

Hamilton was one of the 555 subpostmasters who joined the group legal action of Bates & Others v Post Office Ltd, heard by Justice Fraser in the High Court at the Rolls Building in London between 2017 and 2019. After two subtrials, one of which looked at the subpostmasters' contracts and found largely in their favour and the other which found that Horizon contained bugs, errors and defects that could lead to accounting discrepancies, the claimants had run out of funding and agreed a settlement of £56.75 million with the Post Office. Legal costs of £46 million were deducted, leaving the 555 claimants with less than £12 million to be divided between them. After the settlement was announced, Hamilton said it was one of the best days she had ever had. At the time, her criminal conviction was already being reviewed by the Criminal Cases Review Commission, along with those of other subpostmasters.

== Hamilton & Others v Post Office Limited ==
The judgment in Bates & Others v Post Office Limited paved the way for the convictions of subpostmasters to be overturned. In April 2021 Hamilton was the lead appellant in the first case to be heard in the Court of Appeal, six subpostmasters who had been convicted in Magistrates’ Courts having had their convictions quashed at Southwark Crown Court the previous December. The case of Hamilton & Others v Post Office Limited was heard over four days in March 2021 before Lord Justice Holroyde, Mr Justice Picken and Mrs Justice Farbey at the Royal Courts of Justice in London. There were a total of 42 appellants. Hamilton, along with most of the other appellants, was represented by Tim Moloney KC.

There were two grounds of appeal: firstly that the trials had been unfair because Horizon data was unreliable; secondly that the prosecutions had been an "affront to the public conscience". In the case of Hamilton and three other appellants, the Post Office did not contest either ground. In the case of three appellants, the Post Office successfully contested both grounds, arguing that Horizon data had not been central to their cases. The Post Office conceded ground 1 and unsuccessfully contested ground 2 in the case of the remaining 35 appellants. In Hamilton's case the Post Office conceded that it had been wrong to threaten her with a charge of theft in order to obtain a guilty plea to false accounting and force her pay the Post Office for the Horizon shortfall, and improper to prevent her from making any criticism of Horizon.

Hamilton had known since October 2020 that the Post Office was not going to contest her appeal but was at court on 23 April 2021 to hear the judgment delivered and her conviction formally overturned. The overturning of Hamilton's conviction saw her become eligible for further compensation from the Post Office. She began negotiating with the Post Office in 2021 and was originally offered 20% of the amount she claimed. In 2024 the Post Office increased their offer to 80% of her claim, which she accepted.

== Horizon IT Inquiry ==
An independent review into the Horizon scandal was set up in September 2020, chaired by retired High Court judge Sir Wyn Williams. Following the case of Hamilton & Others v Post Office Limited in 2021 the inquiry was converted into a statutory public inquiry. Hamilton's oral evidence was heard on 14 February 2022. She was the second of about sixty subpostmasters to appear before the inquiry. She spoke about the impact of her prosecution on her health, family life and finances and said: "I've almost become obsessed by fighting for justice. And I can't sleep nights. Literally it goes round and around in my head."

== Recognition ==
On International Women's Day 2024, The Independent newspaper included Hamilton in their 50 most influential women, noting her "pivotal role" in uncovering the scandal.

Hamilton was appointed Officer of the Order of the British Empire (OBE) in the 2025 New Year Honours for services to justice.

In June 2025, Hamilton's memoir Why Are You Here, Mrs Hamilton?: The Post Office Scandal and My Extraordinary Fight for Justice was published by Bonnier Books. The title is taken from the words with which the judge addressed Hamilton at her sentencing at Winchester Crown Court in February 2008.

== Dramatisation ==
Hamilton was played by Monica Dolan in Mr Bates vs The Post Office, a four-part dramatisation of the Post Office scandal broadcast by ITV in the first week of 2024. By April 2024 the series had been watched by 13.5 million people and reignited public interest in the scandal. At the Brit Awards 2024, Hamilton presented one of the awards alongside Dolan. She thanked the public for their support and said: "despite what the government says, they're not paying the postmasters".
