= List of courts which publish audio or video of arguments =

Courtroom photographing, videotaping and broadcasting is restricted in many jurisdictions. The law varies from limited film and electronic media coverage in some countries, to a complete ban in others. This is a list of courts which publish live streams or recordings of arguments.

Place		Level	Court		Live broadcast			Recording		
Country	Subdivision	Level	Name	Abbrev.	Video	Audio	Live captions	Video	Audio	Transcript
—N/a		International	Int'l. Ct. of Just.	ICJ	webtv.un.org & icj-cij.org	?		icj-cij.org & YT @UnitedNations	?	icj-cij.org
—N/a		International	Int'l. Crim. Ct.	ICC	icc-cpi.int	?		YT @IntlCriminalCourt	?	icc-cpi.int
Australia		Supreme, High	High Ct. of Aust.	HCA	hcourt.gov.au	?		hcourt.gov.au	?	AustLII & Jade
Pakistan		Supreme	Sup. Ct. of Pak.	SCP	YT @SCPProceedings	?		YT @SCPProceedings	?	
Philippines		Supreme	Sup. Ct. of the Phil.	?	YT @SupremeCourtPh & sc.judiciary.gov.ph	?		YT @SupremeCourtPh & sc.judiciary.gov.ph	?	
Singapore		Appellate, Trial	High Ct. of Sing.	SGHC	?			YT @SingaporeCourts (limited)	?	
United Kingdom		Supreme	Sup. Ct. of the U.K.	SCUK	supremecourt.uk	?	CC in video	YT @UKSupremeCourt	?	
United Kingdom	England & Wales	Appellate	Ct. of App. (E&W), Civil Div., Ct. 1, Rolls Bldg.	EWCA (Civil), Ct. 1	YT @CourtOfAppeal-CivilDivisio4491	?		No		
United Kingdom	England & Wales	Appellate	Ct. of App. (E&W), Civil Div., Ct. 4, R. Cts. of Just.	EWCA (Civil), Ct. 4	YT @RoyalCourtsofJusticeCour-lh8zt	?		YT @RoyalCourtsofJusticeCour-lh8zt	?	
United Kingdom	England & Wales	Appellate	Ct. of App. (E&W), Civil Div., Ct. 17, Rolls Bldg.	EWCA (Civil), Ct. 17	YT @CourtOfAppeal-CivilDivisio4259	?		YT @CourtOfAppeal-CivilDivisio4259	?	
United Kingdom	England & Wales	Appellate	Ct. of App. (E&W), Civil Div., Ct. 63	EWCA (Civil), Ct. 63	YT @CourtOfAppeal-CivilDivisio5326	?		YT @CourtOfAppeal-CivilDivisio5326	?	
United Kingdom	England & Wales	Appellate	Ct. of App. (E&W), Civil Div., Ct. 67, R. Cts. of Just.	EWCA (Civil), Ct. 67	YT @RoyalCourtsOfJusticeCour-el8ex	?		YT @RoyalCourtsOfJusticeCour-el8ex	?	
United Kingdom	England & Wales	Appellate	Ct. of App. (E&W), Civil Div., Ct. 68, R. Cts. of Just.	EWCA (Civil), Ct. 68	YT @RoyalCourtsOfJusticeCour-vf6xk	?		YT @RoyalCourtsOfJusticeCour-vf6xk	?	
United Kingdom	England & Wales	Appellate	Ct. of App. (E&W), Civil Div., Ct. 69, R. Cts. of Just.	EWCA (Civil), Ct. 69	YT @RoyalCourtsOfJustice69-yf3fb	?		YT @RoyalCourtsOfJustice69-yf3fb	?	
United Kingdom	England & Wales	Appellate	Ct. of App. (E&W), Civil Div., Ct. 70	EWCA (Civil), Ct. 70	YT @CourtOfAppeal-CivilDivisio1782	?		YT @CourtOfAppeal-CivilDivisio1782	?	
United Kingdom	England & Wales	Appellate	Ct. of App. (E&W), Civil Div., Ct. 71	EWCA (Civil), Ct. 71	YT @CourtOfAppeal-CivilDivisio388	?		YT @CourtOfAppeal-CivilDivisio388	?	
United Kingdom	England & Wales	Appellate	Ct. of App. (E&W), Civil Div., Ct. 72, R. Cts. of Just.	EWCA (Civil), Ct. 72	YT @RoyalCourtsofJusticeCour-zp4wj	?		YT @RoyalCourtsofJusticeCour-zp4wj	?	
United Kingdom	England & Wales	Appellate	Ct. of App. (E&W), Civil Div., Ct. 73	EWCA (Civil), Ct. 73	YT @CourtOfAppealCivilDivision929	?		YT @CourtOfAppealCivilDivision929	?	
United Kingdom	England & Wales	Appellate	Ct. of App. (E&W), Civil Div., Ct. 74	EWCA (Civil), Ct. 74	YT @CourtOfAppeal-CivilDivisio3851	?		YT @CourtOfAppeal-CivilDivisio3851	?	
United Kingdom	England & Wales	Appellate	Ct. of App. (E&W), Civil Div., Ct. 75	EWCA (Civil), Ct. 75	YT @CourtOfAppeal-CivilDivisio6577	?		YT @CourtOfAppeal-CivilDivisio6577	?	
United Kingdom	England & Wales	Appellate	Ct. of App. (E&W), Civil Div., Ct. 76	EWCA (Civil), Ct. 76	YT @CourtOfAppeal-CivilDivisio8326	?		YT @CourtOfAppeal-CivilDivisio8326	?	
United Kingdom	England & Wales	Trial (indicted) & appellate (from magistrates' court)	Crown Ct.	Crown Ct.	No			YT @SkyNewsCourts (unofficial, limited to cases of media interest)	?	
United States		Supreme	Sup. Ct. of the U.S.	U.S. Sup. Ct.	No			No	supremecourt.gov & Oyez	supremecourt.gov & Oyez
United States	First Circuit	Appellate (federal)	U.S. Ct. of App. for the 1st Cir.	1st Cir.	No	?	No	No	ca1.uscourts.gov	No
United States	Second Circuit	Appellate (federal)	U.S. Ct. of App. for the 2nd Cir.	2nd Cir.	No	ca2.uscourts.gov	No	C-SPAN (limited)	ca2.uscourts.gov	No
United States	Third Circuit	Appellate (federal)	U.S. Ct. of App. for the 3rd Cir.	3rd Cir.	C-SPAN (limited)	YT @USCourtsCA3	C-SPAN video page (limited)	ca3.uscourts.gov (sometimes); C-SPAN (limited)	ca3.uscourts.gov	C-SPAN video page (limited)
United States	Fourth Circuit	Appellate (federal)	U.S. Ct. of App. for the 4th Cir.	4th Cir.	No	@4thCirc & ca4.uscourts.gov	No	C-SPAN (limited)	ca4.uscourts.gov	No
United States	Fifth Circuit	Appellate (federal)	U.S. Ct. of App. for the 5th Cir.	5th Cir.	C-SPAN (limited)	ca5.uscourts.gov	C-SPAN video page (limited)	C-SPAN (limited)	ca5.uscourts.gov & YT @USCourtsCA5	C-SPAN video page (limited)
United States	Sixth Circuit	Appellate (federal)	U.S. Ct. of App. for the 6th Cir.	6th Cir.	No	ca6.uscourts.gov	No	C-SPAN (limited)	ca6.uscourts.gov	No
United States	Seventh Circuit	Appellate (federal)	U.S. Ct. of App. for the 7th Cir.	7th Cir.	C-SPAN (limited)	YT @CourtOfAppeals7thCircuit413	C-SPAN video page (limited)	ca7.uscourts.gov & C-SPAN (limited)	YT @CourtOfAppeals7thCircuit413 & media.ca7.uscourts.gov	C-SPAN video page (limited)
United States	Eighth Circuit	Appellate (federal)	U.S. Ct. of App. for the 8th Cir.	8th Cir.	No				ca8.uscourts.gov	No
United States	Ninth Circuit	Appellate (federal)	U.S. Ct. of App. for the 9th Cir.	9th Cir.	YT @9thCirc & ca9.uscourts.gov (full); C-SPAN (limited)	No	C-SPAN video page (limited)	YT @9thCirc & ca9.uscouts.gov (full); C-SPAN (limited)	ca9.uscouts.gov	C-SPAN video page (limited)
United States	Tenth Circuit	Appellate (federal)	U.S. Ct. of App. for the 10th Cir.	10th Cir.	No	YT @TheU.S.CourtOfAppealsForTh362	No	No	ca10.uscourts.gov	No
United States	Eleventh Circuit	Appellate (federal)	U.S. Ct. of App. for the 11th Cir.	11th Cir.	ca11.uscourts.gov (full) & C-SPAN (limited)	No	C-SPAN video page (limited)	C-SPAN (limited)	ca11.uscourts.gov	C-SPAN video page (limited)
United States	Distinct of Columbia Circuit	Appellate (federal)	U.S. Ct. of App. for the D.C. Cir.	D.C. Cir.	No	YT @USCourtsCADC	No	C-SPAN (limited)	cadc.uscourts.gov	C-SPAN video page (limited)
United States	Federal Circuit	Appellate (federal)	U.S. Ct. of App. for the Fed. Cir.	Fed. Cir.	No	YT @USCourtsCAFC	No	No	cafc.uscourts.gov	No
United States	California	Supreme (state)	Sup. Ct. of Cal.	Cal. Sup. Ct.	?			YT @CaliforniaCourts 1st & 2nd playlists (limited)	?	
United States	Florida	Supreme (state)	Sup. Ct. of Fla.	Fla. Sup. Ct.	?			C-SPAN (limited)	?	C-SPAN video page (limited)
United States	Kansas	Supreme (state)	Sup. Ct. of Kan.	Kan. Sup. Ct.	YT @KansasSupremeCourt	?		YT @KansasSupremeCourt	?	
United States	Kansas	Appellate (state)	Kan. Ct. App.	Kan. Ct. App.	YT @KansasCourtofAppeals	?		YT @KansasCourtofAppeals	?	
United States	Massachusetts	Supreme (state)	Mass. Sup. Jud. Ct.	Mass. Sup. Ct.	YT @SJCArguments, Suffolk U. archive	?		?		
United States	Massachusetts	Appellate (state)	Mass. App. Ct.	Mass. Ct. App.	YT @MassAppealsCt	?		YT @MassAppealsCt	?	
United States	Mississippi	Supreme (state)	Sup. Ct. of Miss.	Miss. Sup. Ct.	?			YT @MsSCWebmaster	?	
United States	New Jersey	Supreme (state)	Sup. Ct. of N.J.	N.J. Sup. Ct.	?			njcourts.gov	?	
United States	New York	Supreme (state)	N.Y. Ct. of App.	N.Y. Sup. Ct. (Note: New York State has an unusual naming convention. Its lowest court is called "Supreme Court"; its intermediate appellate courts are called "Appellate Division of the Supreme Court"; and its apex court (what most other systems call the Supreme Court) is called the "Court of Appeals". In this table, it is listed as Supreme Court for clarity compared with other systems.)	nycourts.gov & YT @NewYorkStateCourtOfAppeals7445	No		nycourts.gov & YT @NewYorkStateCourtOfAppeals7445	No	nycourts.gov
United States	West Virginia	Supreme (state)	Sup. Ct. of App. of W. Va.	W. Va. Sup. Ct.	YT @WVSupremeCourt (limited)	+1 304 558 1313	?	YT @WVSupremeCourt (limited)	?	
