= Mr Bates vs The Post Office =

2024 British television series

- Title card
- Genre: Drama
- Written by: Gwyneth Hughes
- Directed by: James Strong
- Starring: Toby Jones; Monica Dolan; Julie Hesmondhalgh; Alex Jennings; Katherine Kelly; Lia Williams
- Theme music composer: Vince Pope
- Country of origin: United Kingdom
- Original language: English
- No. of episodes: 4

Production
- Executive producers: Patrick Spence; Gwyneth Hughes; Natasha Bondy; Ben Gale; James Strong; Joe Williams
- Producer: Chris Clough
- Running time: 3 hours 10 minutes
- Production companies: ITV Studios; Little Gem

Original release
- Network: ITV
- Release: 1 January – 4 January 2024

Mr Bates vs The Post Office is a four-part British television drama series for ITV, written by Gwyneth Hughes, directed by James Strong and starring an ensemble cast led by Toby Jones. The series is a dramatisation of the British Post Office scandal, a miscarriage of justice in which hundreds of subpostmasters were wrongly prosecuted (privately and publicly) for theft, false accounting, or fraud due to a faulty computer system called Horizon. It was broadcast on four consecutive days from 1 January 2024.

The series won a Peabody Award at the 85th ceremony. It won the 2025 BAFTA award for Limited Drama

== Synopsis ==
A faulty IT system called Horizon, developed by Fujitsu, creates apparent cash shortfalls that cause Post Office Limited to pursue prosecutions for fraud, theft and false accounting against a number of subpostmasters across the UK. In 2009, a group of these, led by Alan Bates, forms the Justice for Subpostmasters Alliance. The prosecutions and convictions are later ruled a miscarriage of justice at the conclusion of the Bates & Others v Post Office Ltd judicial case in 2019.

== Cast ==
- Toby Jones as Alan Bates
- Monica Dolan as Jo Hamilton
- Julie Hesmondhalgh as Suzanne Sercombe
- Alex Jennings as James Arbuthnot
- Ian Hart as Bob Rutherford
- Lia Williams as Paula Vennells
- Will Mellor as Lee Castleton
- Amy Nuttall as Lisa Castleton
- Susan Brown as Min Howard
- Krupa Pattani as Saman Kaur
- Amit Shah as Jas Singh
- Colin Tierney as Martin Griffiths
- Clare Calbraith as Gina Griffiths
- Shaun Dooley as Michael Rudkin
- Lesley Nicol as Pam Stubbs
- John Hollingworth as James Hartley
- Adam James as Patrick Green QC
- Katherine Kelly as Angela van Den Bogerd
- Isobel Middleton as Kay Linnell
- Ifan Huw Dafydd as Noel Thomas
- Mark Arends as Richard Roll
- Andrew Havill as Stuart Wentworth QC
- Pip Torrens as Lord Justice Fraser
- Nadhim Zahawi as himself
- James Naughtie as himself
- Dana Haqjoo as Behrouz Heydari

== Episodes ==
No.	Title	Directed by	Written by	Original release date	UK viewers (millions)
1	"Episode 1"	James Strong	Gwyneth Hughes	1 January 2024	13.41
2	"Episode 2"	James Strong	Gwyneth Hughes	2 January 2024	13.27
3	"Episode 3"	James Strong	Gwyneth Hughes	3 January 2024	13.60
4	"Episode 4"	James Strong	Gwyneth Hughes	4 January 2024	12.87

== Production ==
Written by Gwyneth Hughes and directed by James Strong, the series was produced by Chris Clough for Little Gem and ITV Studios. Filming began in May 2023 and took place in Llandudno, Conwy, and Tatsfield, Surrey. Former member of the Business Select Committee Nadhim Zahawi had a small role, playing himself.

Journalist Nick Wallis, who has written extensively about the scandal and continues to cover it, was a consultant on the series.

=== Financial losses ===
Although the series had been watched by an estimated 13.5 million people as of late-April 2024, ITV said it had made a loss of around £1 million on the production. Kevin Lygo, ITV's managing director of media and entertainment, partially blamed the lack of international appeal in the subject matter for these losses.

== Broadcast ==
The series was shown on ITV1 from 1 to 4 January 2024, and was released in full on ITVX on the same date. In the United States, the series premiered on PBS's drama anthology Masterpiece in April 2024. In Australia, the series premiered in February 2024 on Channel Seven. In Germany and France the series was shown on Arte in March 2025 and was available on the Arte Mediathek until 24 June 2025.

Immediately after the final episode, ITV broadcast a documentary Mr Bates vs the Post Office: The Real Story.

== Reception ==
The series was well received by critics and awarded four out of five by reviewers in The Times, The Daily Telegraph and The Guardian. Martin Robinson, writing in the Evening Standard, said: "The Kafka-esque situation is thoroughly humanised by the performances". On review aggregator Rotten Tomatoes, 94% of 16 critics gave the film a positive review, with an average rating of 8.3/10. The website's critics' consensus reads, "Dramatizing a grave injustice with terrific acting and plain-spoken righteousness, Mr Bates vs the Post Office shines much-needed light on a national scandal." On Metacritic, the series holds a weighted average score of 80 out of 100 based on seven critics.

=== Accolades ===
The series won the Jury Prize at the 2024 Broadcasting Press Guild Awards. The series won the Judges' Prize at the Royal Television Society Programme Awards in March 2024. At the National Television Awards in September 2024, Toby Jones won the Drama Performance, and the series won the Impact Award and New Drama. That month, the series won the Sky Arts Award for Television. At the 2024 Venice TV Awards, it received the award for Best TV Series.

It was nominated for Best Limited Series at the 30th Critics' Choice Awards in February 2025. The series was awarded a special recognition award at the 2025 Broadcast Awards and "Jo watches as the numbers on her screen increase as she is on the phone to Horizon IT support" won TV Moment of the Year. The series was also nominated for Best Drama Series or Serial. That scene was also nominated for Most Memorable moment at the 2025 British Academy Television Awards. It was nominated for Best Single Drama or Limited Series, and Monica Dolan was nominated for Leading Actress at the Royal Television Society Programme Awards in March 2025. That month, it was nominated at the 2025 British Academy Television Awards for Best Limited Drama, with Toby Jones and Monica Dolan nominated in the Leading Actor and Actress categories. At the ceremony, ITV will be awarded the BAFTA television special award for commissioning the series. BAFTA television committee chair Hilary Rosen said: “This is public service television at its best”.

=== Impact ===
The series was credited for igniting public interest in the scandal and led to demands for the former Post Office CEO Paula Vennells to have her CBE withdrawn; a petition that accrued more than 1.2 million signatures.

Vennells issued a statement on 9 January 2024 that she would "return [her] CBE with immediate effect". However, this had no formal and immediate effect, as only the monarch can revoke or annul honours. Vennells’s appointment as CBE was formally revoked by King Charles III on 23 February for "bringing the honours system into disrepute".

Such was the impact of the drama that the scandal became a major news story, and on the following day Prime Minister Rishi Sunak announced new legislation to exonerate wrongly convicted subpostmasters and said there would be a "new upfront payment of £75,000 for some of those affected".

Post Office Minister Kevin Hollinrake said £1bn had been budgeted for compensation payments. Lead actor Toby Jones spoke of being "very proud" of the impact the drama had, telling BBC Radio Stoke that "there have been many dramas in the past that have had a political influence, but not quite as urgently and directly as this" and that the drama was "brilliantly dramatised by the writer and the fact that it was being spoken about in Parliament within three weeks is absolutely extraordinary."

=== Consequential legislation ===
The Post Office (Horizon System) Compensation Act 2024 received royal assent on 25 January, authorising compensation payments.

Another Act, the Post Office (Horizon System) Offences Act 2024, was passed on 24 May, the Friday a week before Parliament was dissolved for the general election, and came into force the same day. On 13 June a similar Act of the Scottish Parliament received royal assent to deal with offences that came within its legislative competence, coming into force the next day. These Acts quashed all convictions where–

- it was made before the Act came into force;
- it was prosecuted in England and Wales by the Post Office or Crown Prosecution Service, or in Northern Ireland by the police, the Director of Public Prosecutions or the Public Prosecution Service, or in Scotland;
- it was alleged to have been committed between 23 September 1996 and 31 December 2018;
- it was for false accounting, fraud, handling stolen goods, money laundering, or theft, or in Scotland embezzlement, fraud, theft, or uttering, or for attempting, conspiring, encouraging, inciting, aiding, abetting, counselling or procuring any of those offences;
- the defendant was operating a post office business or working in a post office, and the offence was alleged to have been carried out in connection with that work; and
- the post office in question was using Horizon at the time.

The non-Scottish Act made an exception for offences which had been considered by the relevant Court of Appeal. The two Acts also ordered records of cautions and other alternatives to conviction relating to relevant offences to be expunged.

=== Awards and nominations ===
Year	Award	Category	Nominee	Result	Ref.
2024	Broadcasting Press Guild Awards	Jury Award		Won	
2024	RTS Programme Awards	Judges' Award		Won	
2024	National Television Awards	Impact Award		Won	
2024	National Television Awards	Best New Drama		Won	
2024	National Television Awards	Best Drama Performance	Toby Jones	Won	
2024	Sky Arts Awards	Television		Won	
2024	Venice TV Awards	Best Series		Won	
2024	Peabody Awards	Entertainment honoree		Won	
2025	Critics' Choice Awards	Best Limited Series		Nominated	
2025	Broadcast Awards	Best Drama or Serial		Nominated	
2025	Broadcast Awards	TV Moment of the Year	Jo watches as the numbers on her screen increase as she is on the phone to Horizon IT support	Won	
2025	Broadcast Awards	Special Recognition Award		Won	
2025	RTS Programme Awards	Best Limited Series and Single Drama		Nominated	
2025	RTS Programme Awards	Best Leading Actor - Female	Monica Dolan	Nominated	
2025	British Academy Television Awards	Best Limited Drama		Won	
2025	British Academy Television Awards	Best Actor	Toby Jones	Nominated	
2025	British Academy Television Awards	Best Actress	Monica Dolan	Nominated	
2025	British Academy Television Awards	Memorable Moment	Jo Hamilton phones the Horizon helpline	Nominated	
2025	British Academy Television Awards	Special Award	ITV	Won	

== Home releases ==
The series was released on DVD in the United Kingdom in 2024
