= Bates & Others v Post Office Ltd =

2017-19 English court case

- Court: High Court of Justice
- Decided: 2019
- Citations: [2017] EWHC QB 2844; [2018] EWHC QB 2698; [2019] EWHC QB 606; [2019] EWHC QB 871; [2019] EWHC QB 1373; [2019] EWHC QB 3408

Court membership
- Judge sitting: The Honourable Mr Justice Fraser

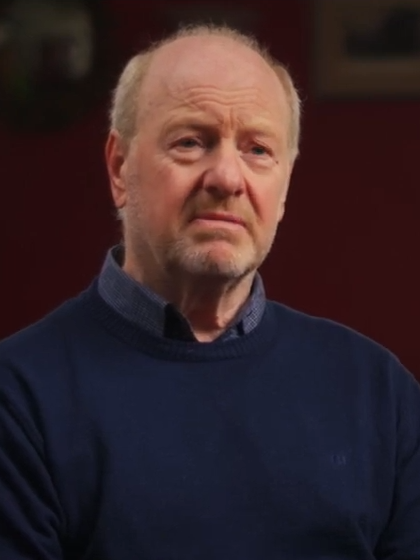
Sir Alan Bates

Bates & Others v Post Office Ltd was a UK group legal action taken by 555 subpostmasters against Post Office Limited, commonly known as the Post Office, the state-owned post office company. It was heard by Justice Fraser in the High Court between 2017 and 2019. Six judgments were handed down, two of them dealing with substantive matters while the rest dealt with procedural matters. The Common Issues trial examined the contract between the subpostmasters and the Post Office and found largely in favour of the claimants, while the Horizon Issues trial found that Horizon, the Post Office's accounting software, contained bugs, errors and defects that could cause shortfalls in the subpostmasters' accounts. Further scheduled trials were not held, as the claimants and the Post Office settled after the Horizon Issues trial.

== Background ==
Subpostmasters are self-employed business operators, who run Post Office branches under contract to the state-owned Post Office. (Note: A few of the claimants were employed directly by the Post Office in larger Crown branches or were subpostmasters' managers and assistants; for convenience they are referred to as subpostmasters.) In 1999 the Post Office rolled out new electronic point of sale and accounting software, Horizon (produced and maintained by Fujitsu), to its network of over 11,000 branches. Soon after the installation of Horizon, sub-postmasters started to experience unexplained shortfalls in their accounts, which, under the terms of their contracts, they were expected to make good with their own money, leading to debt and, on occasion, bankruptcy. The Post Office terminated contracts and pursued subpostmasters through the civil and criminal courts over shortfalls generated by Horizon. Between 1999 and 2015, over 900 subpostmasters were wrongly prosecuted for false accounting and theft. The majority of those prosecutions were private prosecutions brought by the Post Office rather than the Crown Prosecution Service (CPS).

In 2009, the media started to take an interest in Horizon problems, with Computer Weekly breaking the story in May 2009. Later that year Alan Bates, a former subpostmaster who had lost his business due to Horizon shortfalls, set up the Justice For Subpostmasters Alliance (JFSA). Under pressure from the JFSA and a group of Members of Parliament (MPs), led by James Arbuthnot, the Post Office in 2013 appointed forensic accountants Second Sight to investigate Horizon prosecutions. Second Sight were sacked in 2015 after becoming critical of the Post Office’s conduct, and a mediation scheme was closed without reaching any resolution between the Post Office and subpostmasters.

== The case ==
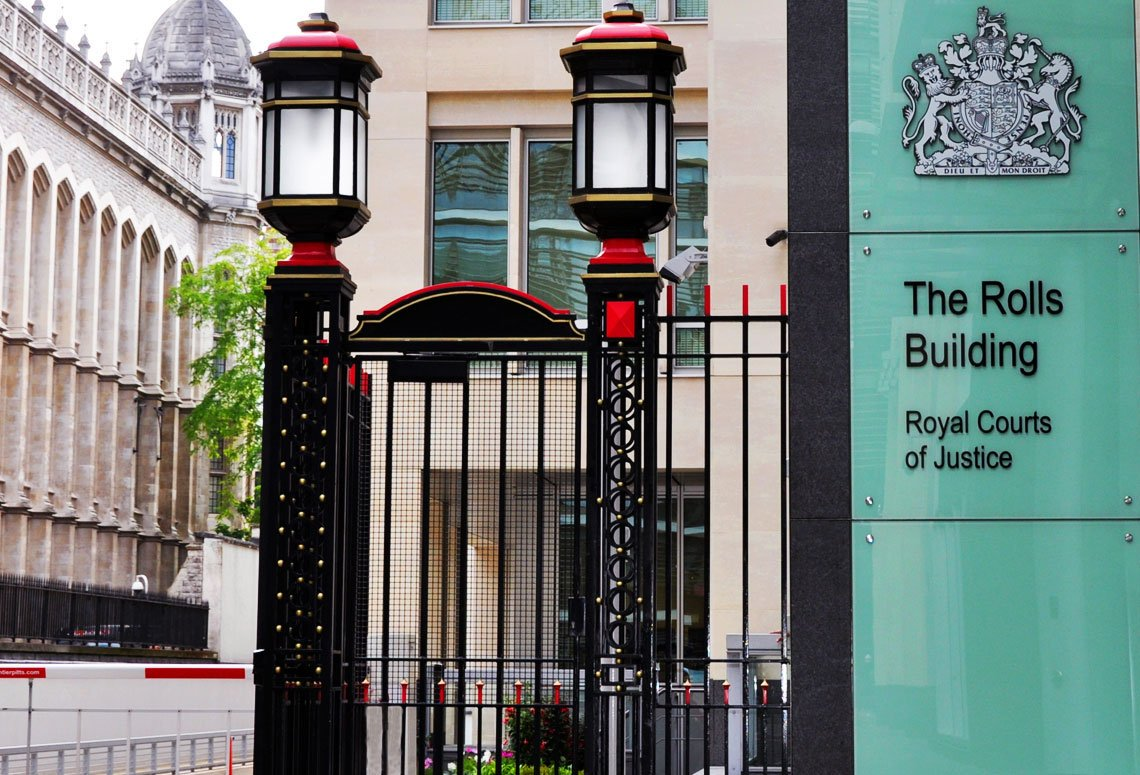
The case was heard in the Rolls Building

After the collapse of the mediation scheme, Bates, who had already consulted two firms of solicitors about the possibility of taking legal action against the Post Office, was able to persuade a new firm of solicitors, Freeths of Nottingham, and litigation funders Therium to take on the case. Bates and forensic accountant Kay Linell formed a steering group to lead the 555 claimants who joined the case. A group litigation order was granted by Senior Master Fontaine on 22 March 2017 and approved by the President of the Queen's Bench Division, with Justice Fraser appointed as managing judge on 31 March.

The subpostmasters claimed to “have been subjected to unlawful treatment by the Defendant causing them significant financial losses (including loss of their business and property), bankruptcy, prosecutions, serving community or custodial sentences, distress and related ill-health, stigma and/or reputational damage”. The Post Office denied the claims, and submitted a counterclaim. The case was scheduled to be heard over a number of trials at the Rolls Building in London.

The claimants were represented in court by a team from Henderson Chambers led by Patrick Green KC, instructed by Freeths, while the Post Office lead barristers included David Cavender KC and Anthony de Garr Robinson KC, both from One Essex Court, instructed by solicitors Womble Bond Dickinson.

== Judgments ==
Six judgments were issued over the course of the litigation. Two of them (judgments 3 and 6) were substantive while the other four (judgments 1, 2, 4 and 5) were procedural.

=== Judgment No. 1 Applications to alter timetable – November 2017 ===
Referring to costs and delay, the judge said, "Fitting hearings around their availability has all the disadvantages of doing an intricate jigsaw puzzle, with none of the fun associated with that activity."

=== Judgment No. 2 Application to strike out evidence – October 2018 ===
This decision followed a case management hearing and dismissed an application to strike out roughly one-quarter of the lead claimants' evidence – more than 160 paragraphs. Justice Fraser said: "The application by the defendant to strike out this evidence appears to be an attempt to... keep evidence with which the defendant does not agree from being aired at all". The judge commented that adverse publicity for the Post Office was not a matter of concern for the court if the evidence was relevant and admissible. He also warned against the aggressive conduct of litigation, particularly in a group action of this nature. The application was dismissed.

=== Judgment No. 3 Common Issues – March 2019 ===
The Common Issues trial was held over 15 days in November and December 2018, with the judgment handed down on 15 March 2019. The subpostmasters and the Post Office had identified 23 issues relating to the contractual relationship between them and about which they disagreed. (Note: The issues were referred to as "common" as they were common to most of the claimants.) The judge made findings on each so that obligations under all iterations of the contracts would be settled, both retrospectively and prospectively. Of the 23 issues, only seven were decided in the Post Office's favour. The parties agreed that broadly the claimants were more successful. Issue 1, concerning whether the contracts were relational contracts, was described by the judge as one of the most important issues. He found subpostmasters' contracts are relational contracts: "This means that the Post Office is not entitled to act in a way that would be considered commercially unacceptable by reasonable and honest people".

The judgment criticised testimony given by Post Office witnesses in court. Referring to Angela van den Bogerd (Head of Partnerships at the Post Office), the judge said: "[she] did not give me frank evidence, and sought to obfuscate matters, and mislead me." He further criticised the Post Office, saying that at times it appeared "to conduct itself as though it is answerable only to itself."

When the judgment was delivered, the Post Office said it would appeal. On 23 May, the judge refused the Post Office permission to appeal and set out his reasons on 17 June. The Post Office applied for permission to appeal that refusal. Lord Justice Coulson refused permission to appeal and handed down his written reasons on 22 November 2019.

=== Judgment No. 4 Application for recusal – April 2019 ===
The Post Office brought in Lord Grabiner to make an application to Justice Fraser that he recuse himself on the grounds of apparent bias. When asked to explain the delay in making the application, which was submitted after the start of the Horizon Issues trial, Grabiner replied that the decision had been made at board level and he had needed time to get up to speed with the case, adding that the application to recuse had "been looked at by another very senior person before the decision was taken..." The recusal application was opposed by the subpostmasters and dismissed by the judge.

The Post Office made an application to appeal the judge's refusal to recuse himself. It was refused by Lord Justice Coulson in the Court of Appeal, who ruled that the application for recusal had been without substance and had been rightly rejected by Justice Fraser. He sympathised with the view of the subpostmasters that the application for recusal had been intended to lead to the collapse of the Horizon Issues trial, although he did not reach any conclusions on the point. He described Grabiner's remark about "another very senior person" as threatening. It was later revealed that the senior person was Lord Neuberger. The Post Office agreed to pay £300,000 in costs for the failed recusal application. The Post Office's own costs of the recusal application were over £212,000, which including £34,165 for solicitors and £174,815 for counsel.

=== Judgment No. 5 Common Issues costs – June 2019 ===
In this judgment, costs were awarded to the subpostmasters for the Common Issues trial, subject to a 10% reduction to reflect the fact that they had not been successful in seven of the issues. The Post Office asked for the costs to be reserved until the end of litigation, as they claimed that an interim decision "would demonstrate a pre-determination as to the overall outcome". The judge saw this as a "veiled or implied threat", similar to that issued in the recusal application, and dismissed the Post Office's argument. He also expressed concern about the high costs that both sides were incurring in the litigation.

=== Judgment No. 6 Horizon issues – December 2019 ===
This judgment concerns the operation and functionality of the Horizon system itself. The hearings took place over 21 days in March, April, June and July 2019. The 313 page judgment was published in December 2019. Justice Fraser found that bugs, errors and defects in Horizon rendered it unreliable and had the potential to cause discrepancies in subpostmasters' accounts. He was critical of the Post Office's evidence, describing it as "bare assertions and denials that ignore what has actually occurred... [amounting] to the 21st century equivalent of maintaining that the earth is flat". He considered that the evidence given by Fujitsu manager Stephen Parker to be not even "remotely accurate". He also criticised the Post Office for adopting a threatening attitude towards subpostmasters and even accusing them of criminal offences in cross examination.

== Settlement ==
A draft of judgment no. 6 was sent to the parties in November 2019 and the claimants, who by that time had run out of funding, agreed a settlement of £56.75 million with the Post Office in December 2019. After legal costs of £46 million were deducted, the 555 claimants were left with less than £12 million to be divided between them. When details were made public in August 2020, it emerged that one condition of the agreement had been the setting up of a compensation scheme for all those subpostmasters (not just the 555) who had suffered losses due to Horizon. The government later announced that it would provide further compensation to the litigants through the GLO compensation scheme, while convicted claimants became eligible for compensation as their convictions were overturned.
