= King's Bench Division =

Division of the English High Court of Justice

- Royal Coat of Arms of the United Kingdom
- Established: 1 November 1875
- Jurisdiction: England and Wales
- Location: Rolls Building, City of London, London
- Appeals to: Court of Appeal (civil matters); Supreme Court (criminal matter)
- Appeals from: Crown Court; Magistrates' courts

President
- Currently: Mark Warby
- Since: 1 October 2026

Vice-President
- Currently: Jeremy Baker
- Since: 5 February 2025

Senior Master and King's Remembrancer
- Currently: Jeremy Cook
- Since: 18 September 2023

The King's Bench Division (or Queen's Bench Division when the monarch is female) of the High Court of Justice deals with a wide range of common law cases in England and Wales and has supervisory responsibility over certain lower courts.

It hears appeals on points of law from magistrates' courts (Note: See Challenges to decisions of England and Wales magistrates' courts.) and from the Crown Court. (Note: See Courts of England and Wales for an explanation of these courts.) These are known as appeals by way of case stated, since the questions of law are considered solely on the basis of the facts found and stated by the authority under review.

Specialised courts of the King's Bench Division include the Administrative Court, Technology and Construction Court, Commercial Court, and the Admiralty Court. The specialised judges and procedures of these courts are tailored to their type of business, but they are not essentially different from any other court of the King's Bench Division.

Appeals from the High Court in civil matters are made to the Court of Appeal (Civil Division); in criminal matters appeal from the Divisional Court is made only to the Supreme Court of the United Kingdom.

== History ==
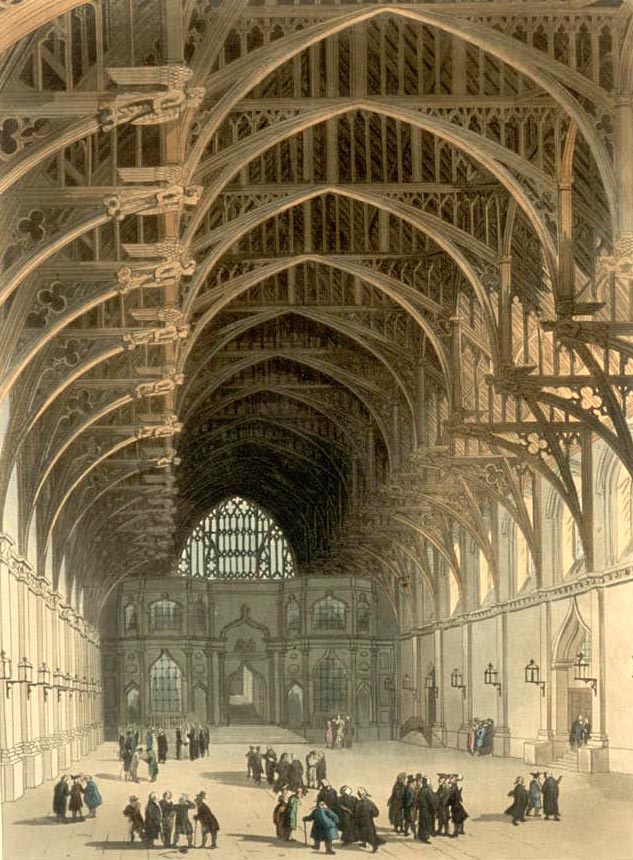
Westminster Hall, meeting place of the Court of King's Bench from 1215 until the King's Bench was abolished in England in 1875

In England and Wales, the Court of King's Bench (or Court of Queen's Bench) was the name of two courts. Each was a senior court of common law, with civil and criminal jurisdiction, and a specific jurisdiction to restrain unlawful actions by public authorities.

The Court of King's Bench grew out of the King's Court, or Curia Regis, which, both in character and the essence of its jurisdiction, dates back to the reign of King Alfred. At first, it was not specifically a court of law, but was the centre of royal power and national administration in England, consisting of the King, together with his advisors, courtiers, and administrators. At an unknown point, another court, independent of the King's personal presence, grew out of the Curia Regis, and consisted of a number of royal judges who would hear cases themselves.

It was recorded in the chronicle of Abbot Benedict of Peterborough that, in 1178, Henry II ordered that five judges of his household should remain in Curia Regis, referring only difficult cases to himself. The situation seemed, thereafter, to be that a central royal court, called The Bench, began to sit regularly at Westminster, leading, at some stage, to a separation between the hearing of matters relevant to the King and those that had no royal connection, which came to be known as common pleas.

In 1215, Magna Carta provided that there should be a court – the Common Bench (later Court of Common Pleas), which met in a fixed place – and, by 1234, two distinct series of plea rolls existed: de banco – those from the Common Bench – and coram rege (Latin for "in the presence of the King") – for those from the King's Bench. The King's Bench, being a theoretically movable court, was excluded from hearing common pleas, which included all praecipe actions for the recovery of property or debt. Actions of trespass and replevin were shared between the two benches. In practice pleas of the Crown were heard only in the King's Bench.

The King's Bench was divided into two parts: the Crown side, which had an unlimited criminal jurisdiction, both at first instance or as a court to which legal questions arising out of indictments in other courts could be referred; and the plea side, which dealt with actions of trespass, appeals of felony, and writs of error. The Lord Chief Justice of the King's Bench was styled the Lord Chief Justice of England, being the highest permanent judge of the Crown.

The King's Bench became a fixed court sitting in Westminster Hall. Its justices travelled on circuit, a requirement of Magna Carta. By a legal fiction, criminal cases to be heard in the shires were set down for trial in Westminster Hall "unless before" (nisi prius) the justice came to the county, which was where the trial actually took place.

During the Commonwealth of England, from 1649 to 1660, the court was known as the Upper Bench.

The English Court of King's Bench was abolished in 1875 by the Supreme Court of Judicature Act 1873. The Court's jurisdiction passed in each case to a new High Court of Justice and specifically to the King's Bench Division of that court.

In 1992, Ann Ebsworth was the first woman to be assigned to the Queen's Bench Division.

The court gave its name to London's King's Bench Prison, in which many defendants were subsequently incarcerated, and to King's Bench Walk in the Inner Temple.

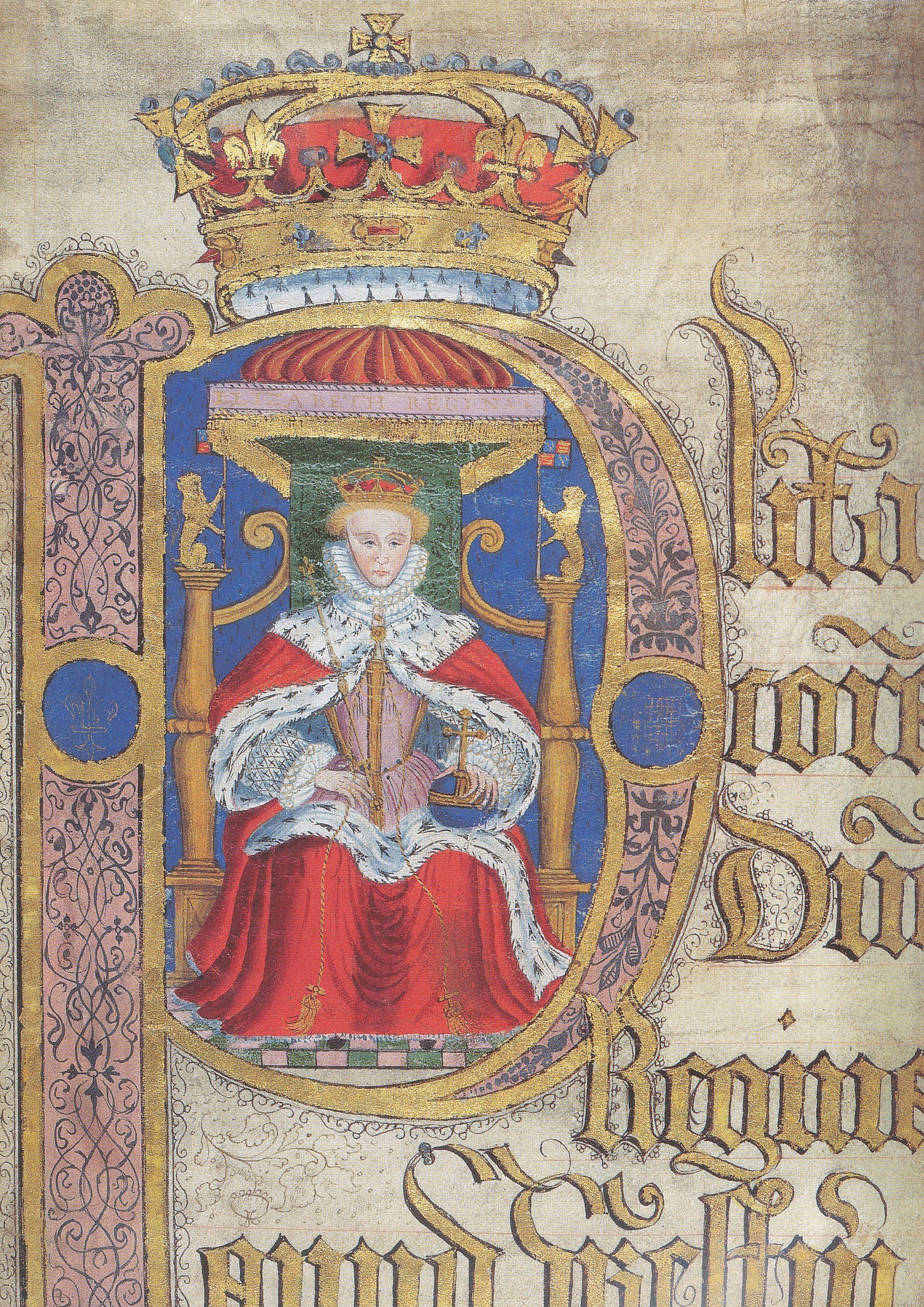
An illuminated initial membrane, with portrait of Elizabeth I, Court of King's Bench: Coram Rege Roll (Easter Term, 1584)

== Subdivisions ==
=== Administrative Court ===
The Administrative Court deals mainly with administrative law matters and exercises the High Court's supervisory jurisdiction over inferior courts and tribunals and other public bodies. It is generally the appropriate legal forum where the lawfulness, but at least in principle not the merits, of official decisions may be challenged. Generally, unless specific appeal processes are provided, the validity of any decision of a minister of the crown, inferior court, tribunal, local authority or other official body may be challenged before a judge by a claimant with sufficient interest through the exercise of judicial review. A single judge first decides whether to give permission for the matter to be brought to the Court, to filter out frivolous or unarguable cases. If such permission is given, the matter will go forward to a full judicial review hearing with one or more judges, unless settled by the parties.

The Administrative Court may sit with a single judge or as a divisional court (i.e. with two or more judges). A divisional court of the Administrative Court usually consists of a Lord Justice of Appeal sitting with a judge of the High Court. Although the Administrative Court is within the King's Bench Division (reflecting the historical role of the Court of King's Bench in exercising judicial review), judges from the Chancery Division and the Family Division of the High Court are also assigned to sit.

=== Commercial Court ===
The Commercial Court is a major civil court in England and Wales that specialises on adjudicating domestic and international business disputes, with a particular emphasis on international trade, banking, insurance, and commodities.

==== History ====
The Commercial Court was set up in 1895 following demands from the City of London and the business community for a tribunal or court staffed by judges with knowledge and experience of commercial disputes which could determine such disputes expeditiously and economically, thereby avoiding tediously long and expensive trials with verdicts given by judges or juries unfamiliar with business practices.

The commercial list was originally heard by two judges of the King's Bench Division with the appropriate knowledge and experience. As the work of the Court has expanded, eight judges now sit in the Court.

==== Function ====
The current work of the Commercial Court entails all aspects of commercial disputes, in the fields of banking and finance, disputes over contracts and business documents, import, export and transport, agency and management agreements, shipping, insurance and reinsurance, and commodities. The court is also the principal supervisory court for London arbitration, dealing with the granting of freezing and other relief in aid of arbitration, challenges to arbitration awards, and enforcement of awards. The Mercantile Court also can hear most of these cases.

It is also a major centre for international disputes. Over 70% of the court's workload involves foreign parties where the only connection with the jurisdiction is the choice of English and Welsh law in a contract.

==== Judges ====
Eight specialist judges sit in the Court at any one time. They are drawn from a list of those authorised due to their specialist knowledge and expertise. The current Judge in Charge of the Commercial Court is Dame Sara Cockerill.

==== Financial List ====
From October 2015, the Commercial Court and the Chancery Division have maintained the Financial List for cases which would benefit from being heard by judges with suitable expertise and experience in the financial markets or which raise issues of general importance to the financial markets. The procedure was introduced to enable fast, efficient and high quality dispute resolution of claims related to the financial markets.

=== Technology and Construction Court ===
The Civil Procedure Rules, which regulate civil procedure in the High Court, allocate non-exhaustive categories of work to the Technology and Construction Court (TCC), principally, as the name suggests, disputes in the areas of construction and technology.

However, since its formation in its current guise in October 1998, the court's jurisdiction has expanded such that many civil claims which are factually or technically complex are now heard in the TCC, beyond its traditional case load. For example, large-scale group personal injury claims are heard by the court, as are disputes arising out of the European Union's public procurement regime.

The court's reputation has steadily grown over the years, such that it is now regarded as a highly capable and knowledgeable court. Its case load has dramatically increased since 1998, both in the form of traditional litigation and through assisted methods of alternative dispute resolution. In 2011, the court moved its central location from its aged buildings in Fetter Lane to the newly constructed £200m Rolls Building.

==== History ====
The predecessor to the court, the Official Referees' Court, was created by the Judicature Acts and lasted until 9 October 1998. The old name reflected its status as a tribunal with no jurisdiction per se, but which could report to judges on its findings. Official Referees became senior circuit judges in 1971. The new Technology and Construction Court, which was founded under the leadership of Mr Justice Dyson (later the Master of the Rolls), aimed to rid the perception this created that the court was not equal to others in the King's Bench Division. When opening the new court, Dyson said the new changes were "of real significance", and included technological advances to aid the court's running, such as a centralised listing system.

With the introduction of the new Civil Procedure Rules on 26 April 1999 following Lord Woolf's report, the TCC's caseload dropped slightly as a result of the new Rules' focus on alternative dispute resolution. This meant fewer claims were issued: previously, claims had been issued as a matter of course as part of the negotiation process.

The proliferation of adjudication following its introduction in the Construction Act 1996 also led to fewer disputes going before the court, but did give the court a new role in enforcing adjudication decisions. The Construction Act gives parties to a "construction contract" a right to refer matters to adjudicators, with the aim of aiding cash flow in the construction sector by allowing disputes to be settled without the need for lengthy and costly court proceedings. Changes to the Construction Act 1996 brought in by the Local Democracy, Economic Development and Construction Act 2009 are likely to see even more disputes referred to adjudication before reaching the TCC.

The Arbitration Act 1996 had a similar effect as adjudication. Such was the effect on the number of cases being brought before the TCC, extra capacity meant that TCC judges could act as judge-arbitrators, utilising their experience and knowledge while contributing to the CPR's goals in reducing litigation costs.

==== Jurisdiction ====
The TCC deals primarily with litigation of disputes arising in the field of technology and construction. It includes building, engineering and technology disputes, professional negligence claims and IT disputes as well as enforcement of adjudication decisions and challenges to arbitrators’ decisions. The TCC also regularly deals with allegations of lawyers’ negligence arising in connection with planning, property, construction and other technical disputes.

The work of the TCC often involves both complex legal argument and heavyweight technical issues, and as a result TCC judges try some of the most arduous and complex disputes that come before the civil courts. The sums at issue can be large, often involving millions of pounds, although there is in theory at least no minimum sum to be claimed (as, under the CPR, the court has wide powers to assert jurisdiction over claims it feels are appropriate). Cases can last several days and involve mountains of paperwork and expert evidence.

In the housing construction case Robinson v Jones (2011), litigation initially began outside the TCC until after more than two years it was transferred. After passing judgment on the case in the Court of Appeal, Lord Justice Jackson stated that he "deplored the fact" that the litigation had run for so long outside the appropriately skilled court.

==== Court locations ====
TCC cases are managed and heard by specialist judges in London and at centres throughout England and Wales. The cases are allocated either to High Court judges, senior circuit judges, circuit judges or recorders both in London and at regional centres outside London. Since its inception, the court has been led by several judges-in-charge, a role filled by a number of pre-eminent judges in the field of construction law: Lord Dyson, Sir John Thayne Forbes, Sir Rupert Jackson, Sir Vivian Ramsey, Mr Justice Akenhead (2010 to 2013), Sir Antony Edwards-Stuart (2013 to 2016), Sir Peter Coulson (2016 to 2018), Sir Peter Fraser (2018 to 2020) and Dame Finola O'Farrell (2020 to present). As at 2019, the court has seven full-time High Court judges.

In April 2011, the court moved its central location from its aged building in Fetter Lane to a purpose-built building on Fetter Lane, the Rolls Building, not far from the Royal Courts of Justice in London. The court shares the building with other divisional courts of the King's Bench and Chancery Divisions. As well as its London location, where most cases (including those with an international element) are heard after being started or transferred there, claims can be issued and heard at any of the following regional court centres:

- Birmingham (full-time TCC judge available)
- Bristol
- Cardiff
- Chester
- Exeter
- Leeds
- Liverpool (full-time TCC judge available)
- Manchester (full-time TCC judge available)
- Newcastle
- Nottingham

TCC authorised judges are also available at Leicester, Sheffield and Southampton, although claims cannot be issued there.

=== Admiralty Court ===
England's admiralty courts date to at least the 1360s, during the reign of Edward III. At that time there were three such courts, appointed by admirals responsible for waters to the north, south and west of England. In 1483 these local courts were amalgamated into a single High Court of Admiralty, administered by the Lord High Admiral of England. The Lord High Admiral directly appointed judges to the court, and could remove them at will. This was amended from 1673, with appointments falling within the purview of the Crown, (Note: An exception was Judge Humphrey Henchman, appointed in June 1714 by direction of the Board of Admiralty, rather than the monarch. Henchman served for six months and was removed from office in December 1714.) and from 1689 judges also received an annual stipend and a degree of tenure, holding their positions subject to effective delivery of their duties rather than at the Lord High Admiral's pleasure.

From its inception in 1483 until 1657 the court sat in a disused church in Southwark, and from then until 1665 in Montjoy House, private premises leased from the Dean of St Paul's Cathedral. In order to escape the Great Plague of London in 1665, the court was briefly relocated to Winchester and then to Jesus College at Oxford University. The plague threat having subsided by 1666, the court returned to London and until 1671 was located at Exeter House on The Strand before returning to Montjoy House near St Paul's.

During the period after the French and Indian War, admiralty courts became an issue that was a part of the rising tension between the British Parliament and their American Colonies. Starting with the Proclamation of 1763, these courts were given jurisdiction over a number of laws affecting the colonies. The jurisdiction was expanded in later acts of the Parliament, such as the Stamp Act of 1765.

The colonists' objections were based on several factors. The courts could try a case anywhere in the British Empire. Cases involving New York or Boston merchants were frequently heard in Nova Scotia and sometimes even in England. The fact that judges were paid based in part on the fines that they levied and naval officers were paid for bringing "successful" cases led to abuses. There was no trial by jury, and evidence standards were lower than in criminal courts, the latter requiring proof "beyond reasonable doubt". The government's objective was to improve the effectiveness of revenue and excise tax laws. In many past instances, smugglers would avoid taxes. Even when they were caught and brought to trial, local judges frequently acquitted the popular local merchants whom they perceived as being unfairly accused by an unpopular tax collector.

In 1875, the High Court of Admiralty governing England and Wales was absorbed into the new Probate, Divorce and Admiralty (or PDA) Division of the High Court. When the PDA Division was in turn abolished and replaced by the Family Division, the "probate" and "admiralty" jurisdictions were transferred to, respectively, the Chancery Division and to the new "Admiralty Court", a subset of the King's Bench Division of the High Court. Strictly speaking, there was no longer an "Admiralty Court" as such, but the admiralty jurisdiction allocated by the Senior Courts Act 1981 was (and is) exercised by the Admiralty Judge and other Commercial Court judges authorized to sit in admiralty cases. When these judges sat, it became convenient to call the sitting the "Admiralty Court".

Lord Denning was one of the leading justiciars in Admiralty court of the late 20th century. For example, he decided The Hansa Nord case Cehave v Bremer in 1976 and demonstrated the continued pre-eminence of London as the legal centre of the high seas.

In England and Wales today, admiralty jurisdiction is exercised by the High Court of Justice in England (EWHC). Admiralty law applied in this court is based upon the civil law-based Law of the Sea, with statutory law and common law additions.

The Admiralty Court is no longer in the Royal Courts of Justice in the Strand, having moved to the Rolls Building in 2011.

== Leadership ==
=== President ===
Until 2005, the head of the Division was the Lord Chief Justice. The post of president of the King's Bench Division was created by the Constitutional Reform Act 2005, leaving the Lord Chief Justice as president of the Courts of England and Wales, head of the Judiciary of England and Wales and head of Criminal Justice. Sir Igor Judge was the first person to hold the office, appointed in October 2005.

==== List of presidents ====
- 3 October 2005: Sir Igor Judge
- 1 October 2008: Sir Anthony May
- 3 October 2011: Sir John Thomas
- 1 October 2013: Sir Brian Leveson
- 23 June 2019: Dame Victoria Sharp
- 1 October 2026: Sir Mark Warby

=== Vice-President ===
The office of Vice-President of the King's Bench Division predates the separation of the division's presidency from the office of Lord Chief Justice. In 1988, the Lord Chief Justice, Lord Lane, made arrangements for Sir Tasker Watkins, a Lord Justice of Appeal, to be Deputy Chief Justice, deputising across the range of Lane's responsibilities. The arrangement continued under Lane's successor. When Watkins retired in 1993, Lord Taylor of Gosforth appointed Sir Paul Kennedy of the Court of Appeal to oversee the Queen's Bench Division.

Lord Bingham of Cornhill, who took over as Lord Chief Justice in 1996, made arrangements with Lord Mackay of Clashfern (Lord Chancellor under John Major) whereby Lord Justice Kennedy would become Vice-President of the Queen's Bench Division, with the understanding that it would be made a statutory office at an early date. Lord Bingham made the appointment in 1997. Lord Mackay's Labour successor, Lord Irvine of Lairg, honoured the commitment in the Access to Justice Act 1999.

==== List of vice-presidents ====
- 1997: Sir Paul Kennedy
- February 2002: Sir Anthony May
- October 2008: Sir John Thomas
- 3 October 2011: Dame Heather Hallett
- 4 March 2014: Sir Nigel Davis
- 1 January 2016 Dame Victoria Sharp
- 5 February 2020 Sir James Dingemans
- 5 February 2025 Sir Jeremy Baker

== See also ==
- Lord Chief Justice
- Master of the Rolls
- President of the Family Division
- Chancellor of the High Court
