= Challenges to decisions of England and Wales magistrates' courts =

This article concerns the legal mechanisms by way of which a decision of an England and Wales magistrates' court may be challenged. There are four mechanisms under which a decision of a magistrates' court may be challenged:

- reconsideration by the same magistrates' court;
- appeal to the Crown Court;
- appeal to the High Court of Justice (King's Bench Division) by way of case stated; and
- judicial review in the High Court (King's Bench Division).

== Reconsideration by the magistrates' court ==
A magistrates' court may set aside and vary decisions of its own court, in relation both to sentence and conviction.

In relation to conviction, a magistrates' court may order a rehearing of a case against a person convicted by that magistrates' court. The court may exercise the power when it appears to be in the interests of justice to do so. There is no strict time limit for making an application for a case to be re-heard but delay can be taken into account when deciding whether or not to order a re-hearing.

A magistrates' court has power to vary or rescind an order made by it, which includes a sentence. The power is used where there has been a mistake. The power may exceptionally be used to increase sentence.

== Appeal to the Crown Court ==
A person convicted of an offence by a magistrates' court may appeal to the Crown Court against their sentence. A person who pleaded not guilty may also appeal against his conviction. A person who has pleaded guilty may only appeal if his guilty plea was equivocal when made, if his guilty plea has subsequently shown to be equivocal, if they wish to argue that they had already been acquitted or convicted of the same offence on another occasion, or where a reference is made by the Criminal Cases Review Commission.

The appeal to the Crown Court is by way of rehearing. New evidence may be called, but the Crown Court has no power to amend information upon which the appellant was convicted (or revoke amendments made by the magistrates' court). The Crown Court will consider whether the decision of the magistrates' court was correct rather than whether it was reasonable. The Crown Court may confirm, reverse or vary the original decision or may remit the case to the magistrates' court. When acting in this capacity, the Crown Court may not order a sentence which the magistrates' court had no power to order.

The appeal will ordinarily be heard by a Crown Court judge and two magistrates (who will not be those involved in the original trial). If the appeal is from a youth court then there will ordinarily be one male and one female magistrate and each will be authorised to sit in the Youth Court. Decisions on law should be made by the Crown Court judge. Decisions on the facts may be made by a majority. The presiding judge should give reasons for the decision, whether the appeal is allowed or refused.

Irrespective of whether the convicted person is appealing against sentence or conviction, they have not more than 21 days after sentence or the date sentence is deferred, whichever is earlier, to lodge a notice of appeal. No particular form is stipulated, but the notice must state whether the appeal is against conviction, against sentence or against both and the reasons for the appeal. Applications made out of time may be considered by the Crown Court, taking into account the merits of the case and the reasons for the delay.

Pending the appeal, a person may be granted bail by the magistrates' court or Crown Court.

A party aggrieved by the decision of the Crown Court may appeal by way of case stated or apply for judicial review.

== Appeal by way of case stated ==
Following any conviction, order determination or other proceeding of the magistrates' court, both the convicted person and the prosecution may apply to that magistrates' court to state a case for the opinion of the high court. This process may be used where the challenge is on the basis that the magistrates' decision is wrong in law or is in excess of jurisdiction.

The application to the magistrates must be made within 21 days of the decision being challenged. The application may be refused on the basis that the application is frivolous, so long as the justices issue a statement to that effect and briefly give their reasons. Any refusal may be challenged by way of application to the High Court. If the application is allowed, the legal adviser will draft a "case", which is a document stating the facts of the case and the question or questions of law to be determined. The case will only contain evidence if one of the questions was whether there was any evidence on the basis of which the magistrates could convict.

The appeal is to the Divisional Court of the King's Bench Division of the High Court. Two or three judges will sit. Two judges must agree for the application to be successful. The Divisional Court may reverse, affirm or amend the decision of the magistrates' court, or remit the case to the magistrates' court. The Divisional Court may make any order as it sees fit.

The appellant has no right to bail but may be granted bail by the magistrates' court or, if the magistrates' court refuses, a judge of the High Court.

== Judicial review ==
An application for judicial review may be made on the grounds that the magistrates' court has exceeded its powers by making an error of law, acting outside of its jurisdiction or breached natural justice. Applications may be made against convictions or sentence, but judicial review of sentence will rarely be appropriate.

An application for judicial review may be made promptly and not later than three months after the decision of the magistrates' court of which the applicant complains.

Where the magistrates' court has acted outside of its powers, the High Court may grant quashing orders, mandatory orders and prohibiting orders. These orders are discretionary and may be refused in the interests of justice.

Appeal by way of case stated should be the ordinary method of challenge where it is alleged there has been an error of law. Judicial review should not be used to evade the 21-day time limit. Judicial review is more appropriate where there is an issue of fact which may have to be raised and decided and which the Justices cannot have decided for themselves.

== Appeal from the magistrates' courts in family matters ==
Provisions contained within the Access to Justice Act 1999 (Destination of Appeals) (Family Proceedings) Order 2009 s.4 insert s.111A into the Magistrates' Courts Act 1980. This section dictates that:

- (1) This section applies in relation to family proceedings in a magistrates' court.
- (2) Any person who was a party to any proceeding before the court, or is aggrieved by the order, determination or other proceeding of the court, may question the proceeding on the ground that it is wrong in law or is in excess of jurisdiction by appealing to a county court.

Subsequently, all appeals from the magistrates' courts will now be dealt with by the County Court and will have 21 days in which to file the appeal. [s.111A(4)]

== Bibliography ==
- Hooper; Ormerod; Murphy, eds. (2008). "Section F19 Inferences from Silence and the Non-production of Evidence". Blackstone's Criminal Practice. Oxford. ISBN 978-0-19-922814-0.
