= Fetter Lane =

Street in the City of London

Coordinates: 51.5150°N 0.1096°W

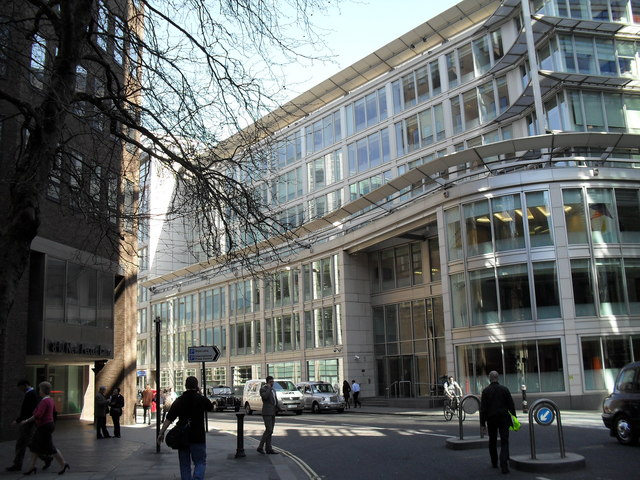
- New Fetter Lane, the northern extension of Fetter Lane towards Holborn Circus

- Location within Greater London
- Sui generis: City of London
- Administrative area: Greater London
- Region: London
- Country: England
- Sovereign state: United Kingdom
- Post town: LONDON
- Postcode district: EC4A
- Dialling code: 020
- Police: City of London
- Fire: London
- Ambulance: London
- UK Parliament: Cities of London and Westminster
- London Assembly: City and East

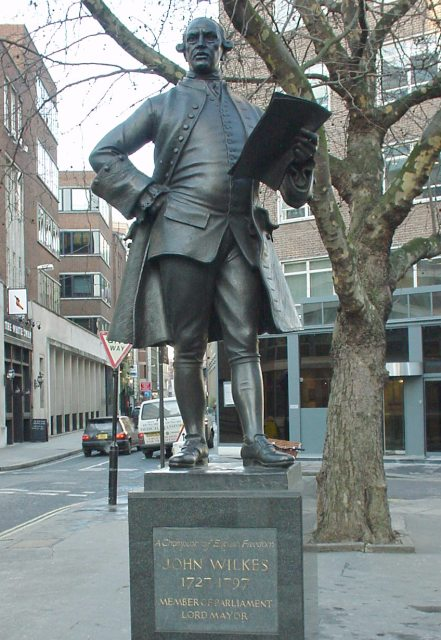
Statue of the politician John Wilkes on Fetter Lane.

Fetter Lane (sometime Fetter-lane) is a street in the ward of Farringdon Without in the City of London, England. It forms part of the A4 road and runs between Fleet Street at its southern end and Holborn.

== History ==
The street was originally called Faytor or Faiter Lane, then Fewteres Lane. This is believed to come from the Old French "faitor" meaning lawyer, though by the 14th century this had become synonymous with an idle person. Geoffrey Chaucer used the word to refer to the beggars and vagrants who were seen around the lane. An alternative origin of the name is the fetter (lance vest) made by armourers working for the nearby Knights Templar.

In the 1590s there was a gibbet at the junction of Fleet Street and Fetter Lane. The Catholic martyr Christopher Bales was among those hanged there. In 1643, the Member of Parliament Nathaniel Tomkins was arrested for conspiracy against the government by withholding taxes, and hanged outside his front door in Fetter Lane.

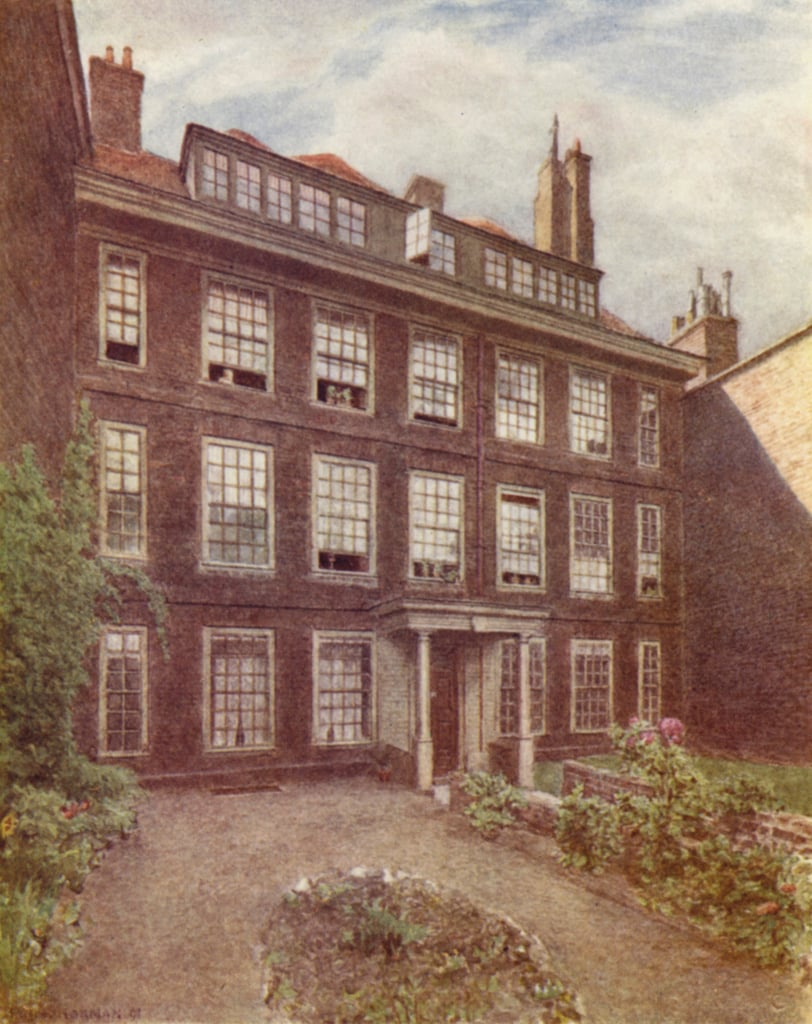
No 10 Nevills Court, Fetter Lane, 1891 by Philip Norman

It is sometimes said that John Dryden lived at No. 16, but there is no evidence for this. In 1604, John Dowland published Lachrimae, or Seaven Teares. The preface states "to be solde at the authors House in Fetter-lane neare Fleet-streete". In 1651 Thomas Hobbes lived in Fetter Lane. In the opening paragraphs of Gulliver's Travels the central character states that he lived briefly at Fetter Lane. From 1660 to 1680 Thomas Goodwin preached at the Fetter Lane Independent Church.

Sampson Lowe were based in St. Dunston house in the late nineteenth century, and many other booksellers and publishers were in the environs over the years.

The Socialist Party of Great Britain was founded in Bartlett's Passage, off Fetter Lane, in 1904. From 1920 to 1961 the Daily Mirror newspaper was initially located in Geraldine House, then moved to the north end of Fetter Lane, at Holborn Circus, and remained there until 1990, when it moved to the Isle of Dogs. The original site, between Rolls Buildings (a street) and Bream's Buildings (another street to the north) was called Rolls House from 1961 until its demolition in 2007. The new site, sometimes called 110 Fetter Lane rather than Rolls House, is the site of an 11-storey building containing 29 courtrooms and other judicial accommodation. 43 Fetter Lane was the longtime headquarters of printing company Monotype until its destruction by bombing in 1941.

== Properties ==
At the southern end, towards Fleet Street, is situated Clifford's Inn, established in 1344 and named after the Barons de Clifford. Towards the northern end, near Holborn, is Barnard's Inn. They were both Inns of Chancery. The official address of the old Public Record Office (1856–1997) was on Chancery Lane, but the back of this building dominates the southern stretch of Fetter Lane. It is now the Maughan Library belonging to King's College London.

On Fleet Street is St Dunstan-in-the-West, and next to it, at 133–137 Fetter Lane, is St Dunstan's House. In Victorian times the publishing house Sampson Low was located at St Dunstan's House. Two plaster reliefs (1886) by Walter Crane were salvaged from the building when it was destroyed in 1905. They now stand next-door in the King's College library. The site then became the main London warehouse of the Cambridge University Press. It is now the Technology and Construction Court hearing litigation related to science and engineering. The Admiralty Court is also at St Dunstan's House.

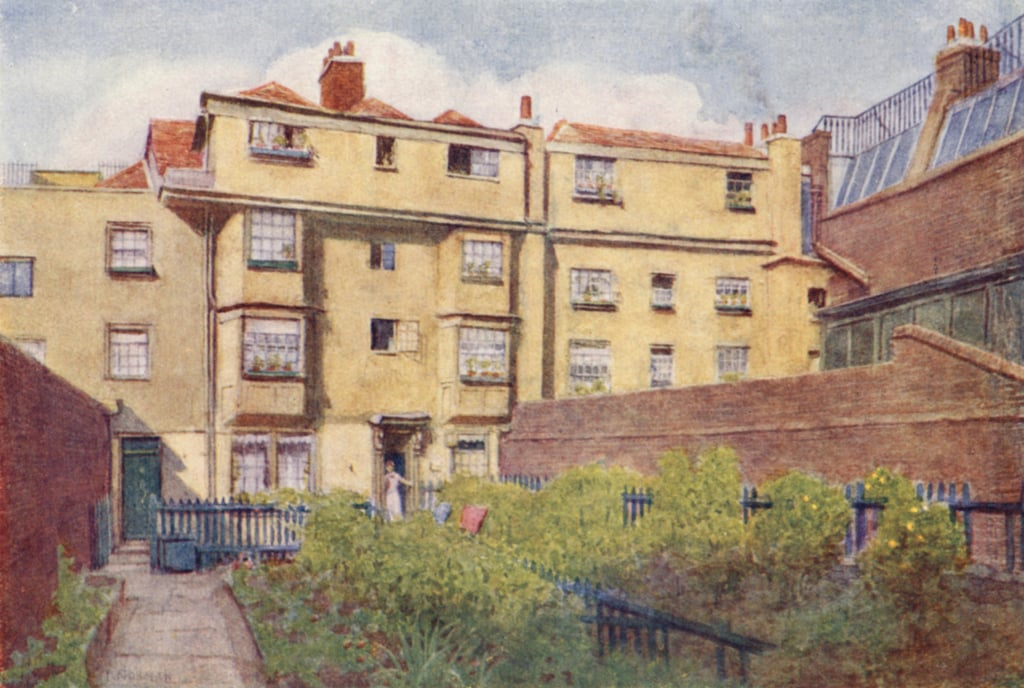
Nos 13, 14, and 15 Nevills Court, Fetter Lane, 1901 by Philip Norman

At No. 33, the Moravian Chapel (Fetter Lane Society) was founded in 1738. The Trust Society for the Furtherance of the Gospel was founded by the Moravian Church in 1741. They undertook missionary work and were based at Fetter Lane. The composer Christian Ignatius Latrobe did missionary work for them in South Africa. The organisation still exists, but is now based in Muswell Hill. For 67 years, Birkbeck, University of London, was at Bream's Buildings on Fetter Lane. The writers Charles Lamb and Mary Lamb attended William Bird's Academy in Fetter Lane.

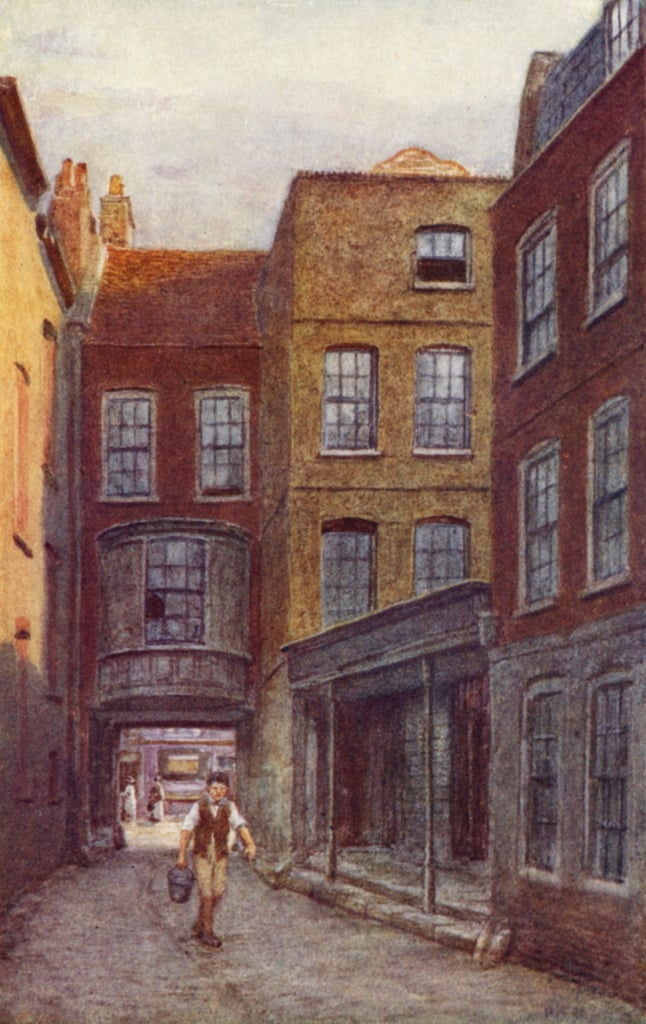
Gateway and Entrance of White Horse Inn, Fetter Lane, 1898 by Philip Norman

Peter Böhler, the London Moravian leader of the Fetter Lane Society, and his followers established it for the purpose of discipleship and accountability. They began with the purpose of meeting once a week for prayer and fellowship. Most of their members were Anglicans, most prominently John Wesley, Charles Wesley, and George Whitefield. John Wesley records in his journal for 1 January 1739: "Mr. Hall, Hinching, Ingham, Whitefield, Hutching, and my brother Charles were present at our love feast in Fetter Lane with about 60 of our brethren. About three in the morning, as we were continuing instant in prayer, the power of God came mightily upon us insomuch that many cried out for exceeding joy and many fell to the ground. As soon as we were recovered a little from that awe and amazement at the presence of His majesty, we broke out with one voice, 'We praise Thee, O God, we acknowledge Thee to be the Lord.'"

A statue of John Wilkes was erected in 1988 at the location where Fetter Lane joins New Fetter Lane.

On 7 December 2011 the Rolls Building, a new court of the High Court of Justice principally for commercial and property cases, was formally opened by Queen Elizabeth II.
