= Peter Fraser (judge) =

British judge (born 1963)

The Right Honourable Lord Justice Fraser
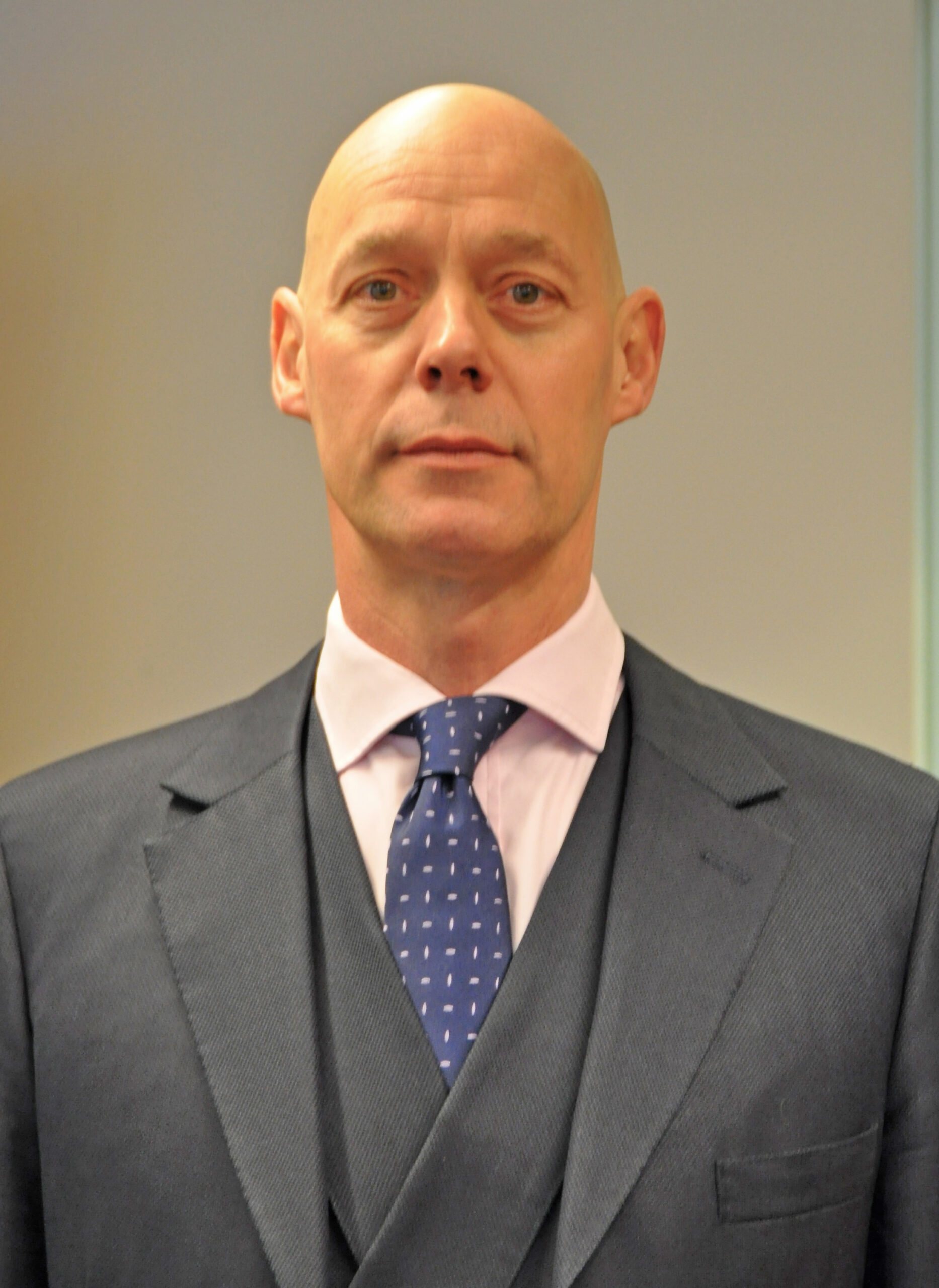

Lord Justice of Appeal
- Incumbent
- Assumed office 15 December 2023
- Monarch: Charles III

Justice of the High Court
- In office 2015–2023
- Monarchs: Elizabeth II; Charles III

Personal details
- Born: 6 September 1963 (age 63) County Down, Northern Ireland
- Education: St John's College, Cambridge

Sir Peter Donald Fraser PC (born 6 September 1963), styled The Right Honourable Lord Justice Fraser, is a Judge of the Court of Appeal of England and Wales.

Born in County Down, Northern Ireland, he attended Harrogate Grammar School and then won an Open Exhibition to St John's College, Cambridge, from where he obtained both an MA in law and an LLM.

Fraser represented Cambridge University in basketball, playing against Oxford in the Annual Varsity match in 1984 and 1985. He also rowed for the Lady Margaret Boat Club. Boats he rowed in won the University IVs competition twice (Clinker IVs, 1984; Shell IVs, 1985); and finished fourth (in 1985 and 1986) and Head of the River (1988) in the May Bumps. He was selected for Blue Boat trials and awarded a CUBC trial cap.

He was called to the Bar by Middle Temple on 21 November 1989, and was awarded a Harmsworth Exhibition and Ashbury Scholarship by the Inn. He was a summer associate in the Los Angeles office of White & Case in both 1988 and 1989, and after completing his pupillage at Atkin Chambers in Gray's Inn, he remained there in practice until he was appointed to the High Court Bench in 2015. His practice was in the field of technology, engineering, construction and international arbitration. He practised both in the UK and internationally, including in Hong Kong, China, South Africa, Sweden, Botswana, France, Dubai, Qatar, Oman, Bermuda, and the Bahamas, where he was called to the Bar in 2007. He was appointed a recorder of the Crown Court in 2002, sitting on the Western Circuit, and Queen's Counsel in 2009. He became a High Court Judge, assigned to the Queen's Bench Division, on 1 October 2015, and was made a Knight Bachelor in November 2015.

He served as the Judge in Charge of the Technology and Construction Court from 2017 to 2020, part of the Business and Property Courts that sit in the Rolls Building in London. He also sits as a Judge of the Commercial Court.

He has also served as an arbitrator at the International Chamber of Commerce in Paris, and is the consulting editor of Building Law Reports, having been editor from 1990 to 2015.

His notable cases include being the managing judge of the group litigation called Bates & Others v Post Office Ltd, brought by 550 sub-postmasters against the Post Office over issues resulting from the Horizon IT system. In the associated television dramatisation Mr Bates vs The Post Office, Fraser is portrayed by Pip Torrens.

In 2021, he was one of two High Court judges that ruled that Uber could only legally operate in the UK as a principal with respect to its passengers, and could not legally operate as an agent between the driver and the passenger.

He was appointed as the Chair of the Law Commission of England and Wales, replacing Sir Nicholas Green, with effect from 1 December 2023.

Fraser was elevated to the Court of Appeal with effect from 15 December 2023. He was appointed to the Privy Council on 22 May 2024. He is an Honorary Fellow of St.John's College, Cambridge.

He competes as an Ironman triathlete.
