= Rolls Building =

Court building in London, England

Coordinates: 51.5159°N 0.1097°W

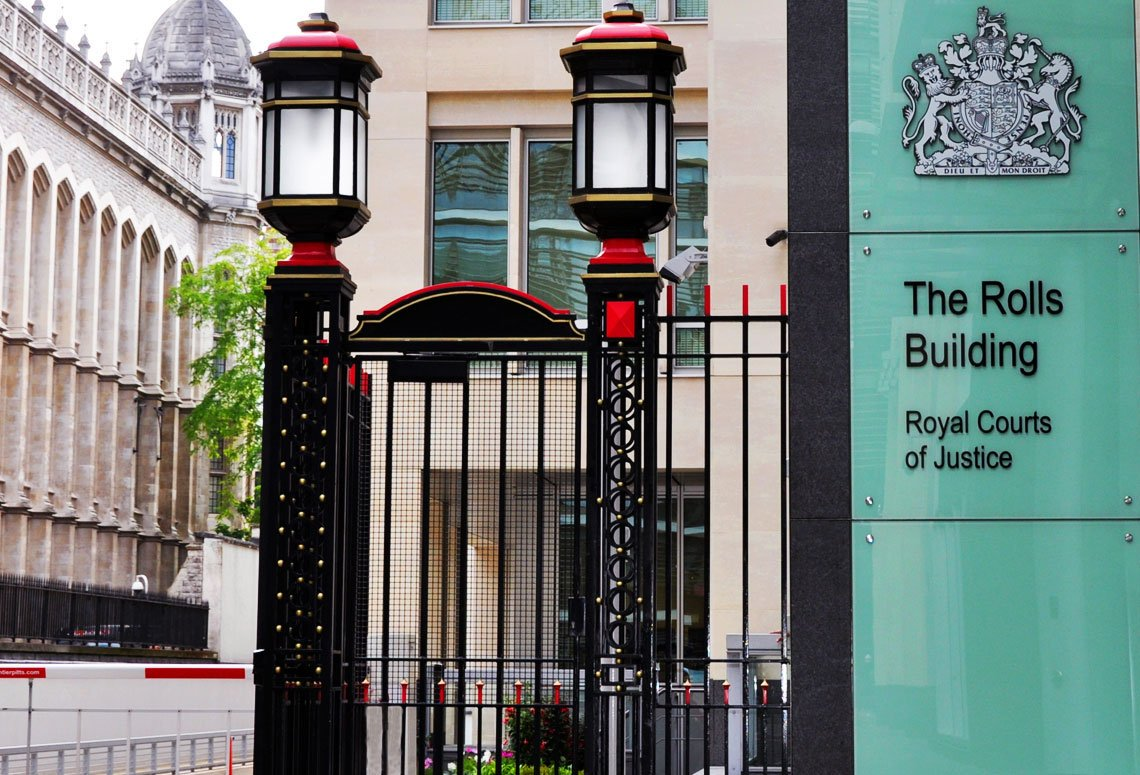
Entrance to The Rolls Building

The Rolls Building is a judicial court complex on Fetter Lane in the City of London that is used by the High Court of Justice (one of the Senior Courts of England and Wales). It houses the commercial and property business of the Chancery Division (including bankruptcy), as well as the Admiralty Court, Commercial Court, and the Technology and Construction Court. The building has 31 courtrooms, including three "super courts" for high-value cases, and four landscape-oriented courtrooms for multi-party cases. The basement and top floors are available for lease by commercial law firms.

The building was designed by Woods Bagot and built by Carillion for developers Delancey Estates and Scottish Widows and was formally opened by Queen Elizabeth II on 7 December 2011.

== See also ==
- Rolls Chapel
