= 2024 in the United Kingdom =

Events from the year 2024 in the United Kingdom. This year is noted for a landslide general election victory for the Labour Party under Keir Starmer.

== Incumbents ==
- Monarch – Charles III
- Prime Minister
  - Rishi Sunak (Conservative) (until 5 July)
  - Keir Starmer (Labour) (starting 5 July)

== Events ==
=== January ===
- 1 January
  - Figures show the annual number of migrants crossing the English Channel fell during 2023, doing so for the first time since records began. The provisional annual total for 2023 is 29,437, a 36% decrease from the 2022 total of 45,774.
  - Secretary of State for Defence Grant Shapps says that British forces are ready to act against Houthi rebels targeting cargo ships in the Red Sea.
  - VAT on period pants is abolished, potentially making the products cheaper to buy.
  - A 5% increase in the price cap on domestic energy comes into force for England, Scotland and Wales.
  - Kimberlee Singler, a 35-year-old mother accused of the murder of two of her children in Colorado, United States, appears before Westminster Magistrates Court for extradition proceedings following her arrest in London on 30 December 2023.
  - HMRC announces a crackdown on tax evasion by those who make extra cash from "side hustle" websites like Airbnb, Amazon, eBay and Etsy.
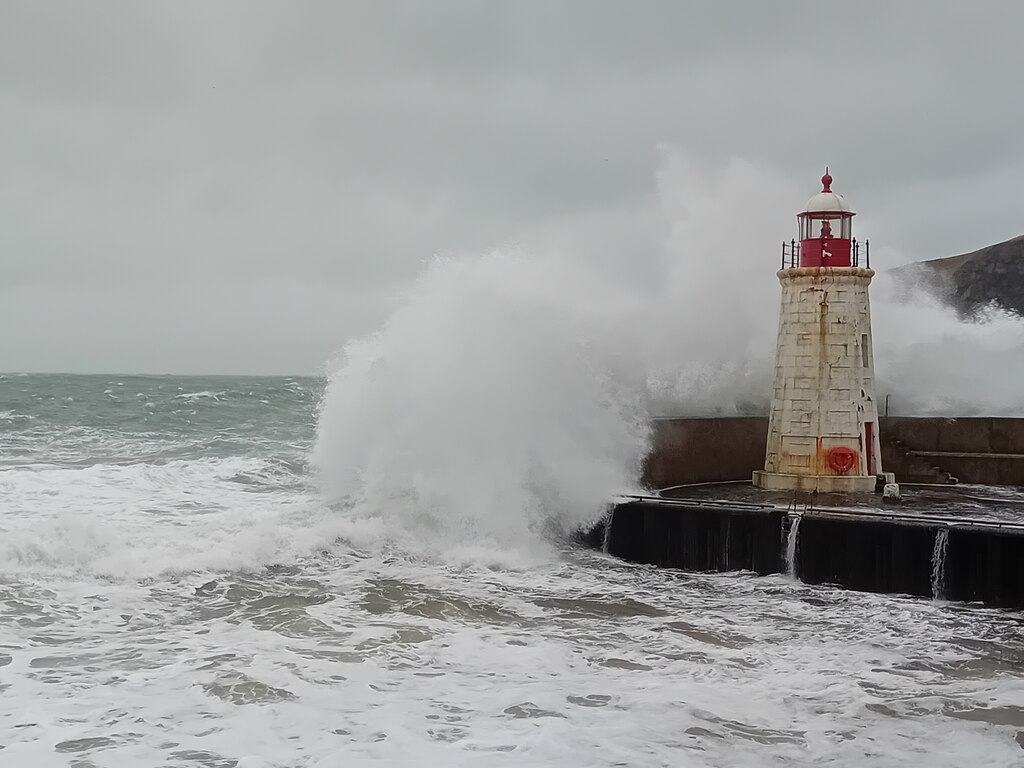
- Lybster Harbour, Latheron during Storm Henk
  2 January
  - Storm Henk:
    - The Met Office issues a severe weather warning as Storm Henk hits parts of the UK, bringing winds of up to 80 mph (128 km/h), along with the risk of flooding.
    - A man in his 50s dies on the A433 near Kemble, Gloucestershire after a tree falls on his car during high winds.
    - At the London Eye, strong winds blow open a pod hatch while a family of 11 is 400 ft in the air.
    - Footage emerges of a mother and her three-year-old daughter being rescued from a submerged car in Birmingham.
    - An 87-year-old woman dies on the B4526 near Crays Pond, Oxfordshire after the car she is driving hits a fallen tree.
  - Research published by the RAC indicates that the target set by the UK government for installing rapid or ultra-rapid chargers near motorways was missed during 2023.
  - Provisional data released by the Met Office indicates 2023 was the second warmest year on record in the UK behind 2022, with Wales and Northern Ireland experiencing their warmest year on record during 2023.
  - 16-year-old Luke Littler beats Rob Cross to reach the World Darts Championship final, making him the youngest person to reach the final; overtaking Kirk Shepherd who was 21 years and 88 days old when he reached the 2008 final.
- 3 January
  - Luke Littler becomes the youngest finalist of the PDC World Darts Championship as he faces Luke Humphries in the 2024 final at the age of 16 years and 348 days. Humphries wins the final.
  - Halifax, the UK's largest moneylender, cuts its mortgage rates by almost 1%, with other banks and lenders following.
- 4 January
  - Prime Minister Rishi Sunak says his "working assumption" is that the general election will take place in the second half of this year.
  - Sainsbury's announces that they will offer pay rises from March as supermarkets continue their battle to retain workers. The increase means that all their workers will be paid the voluntary Real Living Wage, which is higher than the compulsory National Living Wage.
  - A man is arrested after firing shots at a cinema, newsagent, and a house in Croxteth, Liverpool.
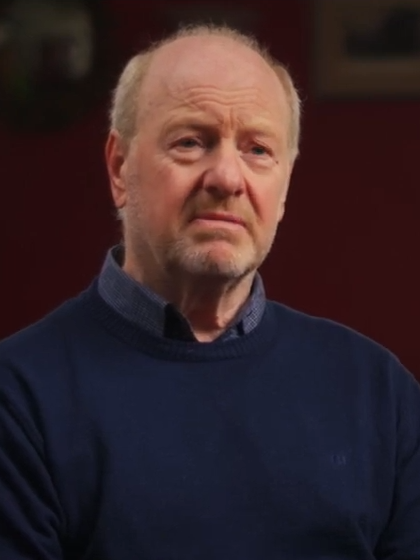
- Sir Alan Bates, whose campaign inspired Mr Bates vs The Post Office
  5 January
  - The Metropolitan Police says it is not investigating allegations against Prince Andrew after unsealed court papers in the United States contained groping allegations against him.
  - Critics brand comments by Sir Howard Davies, chair of NatWest, as "astounding" and "out of touch with reality" after he told BBC Radio 4's Today programme it was "not that difficult" for someone to buy a house.
  - Chris Skidmore, MP for Kingswood, announces his intention to stand down from Parliament "as soon as possible" in protest at the UK government's decision to issue more oil and gas licences. His decision will trigger another by-election.
  - Lawyers representing potential victims of the British Post Office scandal say they have been contacted by a further 50 people following the broadcast of the ITV drama Mr Bates vs The Post Office.
- 6 January
  - The Metropolitan Police confirms it has launched an investigation into the Post Office for potential fraud over the Horizon IT scandal.
  - The rate of National Insurance is reduced from 12% to 10%, reducing NI contributions for an estimated 27 million employees earning between £12,571 and £50,270.
- 7 January
  - Sir Keir Starmer admits he worries about the toll of a general election year on his two teenage children as he and his wife try to keep them out of the public eye.
  - Sunak describes the Post Office scandal as "an appalling miscarriage of justice" and says the government is looking at ways to clear the names of those convicted because of faulty IT software.
- 8 January
  - Mondelez International announces plans to celebrate the bicentenary 200th Anniversary of Cadbury.
  - Chinese authorities say they have detained an individual who they allege has been working for the British Secret Intelligence Service MI6.
  - Ofgem grants permission for energy companies to resume the forced installation of prepayment meters a year after the practice was suspended and after drawing up new rules that prohibits them being installed under certain conditions, such as households where the occupant is over 75, where there are children under two, and for those with certain health conditions.
  - At an event held in Parliament Square, the actor Idris Elba calls on the UK government to introduce an immediate ban on the sale of zombie knives and machetes to reduce the number of young people losing their lives because of the weapons.
  - London and the south-east see a mix of snow, sleet, and rain as the country braces for a week-long cold spell.
  - British Post Office scandal:
    - More than a million people have signed a petition calling for former Post Office chief executive Paula Vennells to be stripped of her CBE in the wake of the Horizon IT scandal.
    - Labour Party leader Keir Starmer, who was Director of Public Prosecutions during the scandal, faces questions over why he failed to intervene in the prosecution of innocent sub-postmasters at the time.
- 9 January
  - Economists say that funding the student loans system in England is expected to cost the government an extra £10 billion a year.
  - British Post Office scandal:
    - Secretary of State for Justice Alex Chalk tells Parliament the UK government is giving "serious consideration" to introducing legislation to quash the convictions of the 700 or so sub post masters who were prosecuted as a result of the Horizon IT scandal.
    - Former Post Office chief executive Paula Vennells announces that she will hand back her CBE after more than a million people signed a petition calling for her to do so.
    - Liberal Democrat leader Ed Davey, who was Post Office minister during the scandal, comes under pressure to return his knighthood.
- 10 January
  - British Post Office scandal:
    - Prime Minister Rishi Sunak announces that emergency legislation will be brought through Parliament to "swiftly exonerate and compensate victims" of the Post Office scandal in England and Wales.
    - First Minister of Scotland Humza Yousaf confirms those in Scotland convicted because of the scandal will also be cleared, and that he will work with the UK government to bring this about.
  - Baroness Heather Hallett, chair of the UK COVID-19 Inquiry, confirms the inquiry will postpone the start of hearing evidence about the development of a vaccine as more time is needed to prepare for a separate investigation into the impact of COVID-19 on the NHS. Consequently, the vaccine evidence, which was due to begin being heard in Summer 2024 may not begin until after the next general election.
  - HS2 Ltd releases a revised forecast for building the London to Birmingham leg of the High Speed 2 rail link, which is now estimated to total £65bn.
- 11 January
  - Former England manager, Sven-Goran Eriksson, announces he has terminal cancer and that he has roughly a year to live.
  - The BBC's Panorama programme finds that fast-fashion firm Boohoo have labelled 'Made in UK' on potentially thousands of clothes that were actually made in South Asia.
  - BBC News research indicates that most NHS targets have been missed for the past seven years.
  - Rishi Sunak authorises joint UK–US air strikes against Houthi rebels following attacks against cargo shipping targets in the Red Sea.
  - A fire starts on the 200 hybrid electric bus during the morning rush hour in Wimbledon.
  - Scutigera coleoptrata, a venomous centipede, is discovered in the United Kingdom for the first time. Dr Richard Jones, an academic at the University of Leicester, spotted the bug in his downstairs bathroom in Upton, Newark-on-Trent, Nottinghamshire.
- 12 January
  - 2024 missile strikes in Yemen:
    - The UK and US launch air strikes against Houthi rebel sites in Yemen.
    - The Liberal Democrats, Scottish National Party and Plaid Cymru call for a recall of parliament to enable a vote on RAF involvement in the air strikes, since Parliament had already risen for the weekend when Sunak authorised the UK's participation.
  - Data from the Office for National Statistics indicates the UK economy grew by 0.3% in November 2023, having retracted by the same amount the previous month, meaning the UK avoided going into recession, although the risk of doing so remains.
  - The government defends spending £27,000 replenishing its wine cellar during the COVID-19 pandemic.
  - Sunak announces a further £2.5bn in military aid for Ukraine during 2024.
  - British Post Office scandal:
    - The BBC reports that Post Office managers threatened and lied to the broadcaster in an attempt to conceal key evidence ahead of the broadcast of the 2015 Panorama documentary that brought the Horizon IT scandal to public attention.
    - Financial experts estimate the Post Office may have underpaid £100m in tax because of how it declared compensation payments to victims of the Horizon IT scandal.
- 13 January
  - Thousands of people join a pro-Palestinian march in London calling for a ceasefire in Gaza due to the ongoing Gaza war.
  - A fleet of electric buses are withdrawn in South London after a fire starts on the 200 hybrid electric bus on 11 January.
  - A new biography of King Charles III by Daily Mail royal correspondent Robert Hardman says that a memo written by Queen Elizabeth II's private secretary, Sir Edward Young, reports that the Queen's final moments in September 2022 were "very peaceful".
  - Five cross-Channel migrants, the first seen in 2024, arrive in a Border Force boat in Kent after being picked up while crossing from France.
- 14 January
  - Five people die when a small boat overturns in French waters as around 70 people try to board it in an attempt to migrate across the English Channel to the UK.
  - Thousands of people attend a pro-Israel rally in London to mark 100 days since the 7 October attack and call for the release of all hostages from Gaza.
  - Six people are arrested over a plot by the protest group Palestine Action to disrupt the London Stock Exchange.
  - Ronnie O'Sullivan wins the 2024 Masters after beating Ali Carter, making him both the youngest and oldest winner in the tournament's history. He won his first title in the 1995 Masters when he was 19 years old. 29 years later, he wins his eighth at the age of 48.
- 15 January
  - The portrait of King Charles III for use on public buildings, such as courts and government offices is unveiled.
  - Another week of strike action is announced by the ASLEF train drivers union, to run from Tuesday 30 January until Monday 5 February.
  - The Home Office announces that it will proscribe the radical Islamist group Hizb ut-Tahrir as a terrorist organisation, accused of praising the Hamas attacks.
  - A review into investigations conducted by Greater Manchester Police between 2004 and 2019 finds that girls were "left at the mercy" of paedophile grooming gangs for several years because of failings by senior police and council bosses.
  - Alison Phillips confirms she will stand down as editor of the Daily Mirror at the end of January, having been in the role since 2018.
- 16 January
  - Schools are closed and commuters face disruption following snowfall across parts of the UK.
  - Lee Anderson and Brendan Clarke-Smith resign their positions as Deputy Chairmen of the Conservative Party, after saying they would back rebel amendments on the Rwanda bill. Jane Stevenson also resigns as a Parliamentary Private Secretary so she can vote for the amendment.
  - British brothers Stewart and Louis Ahearne are sentenced to three and a half years in prison by a court in Switzerland for their part in a 2019 robbery of Ming dynasty art from a museum in Geneva.
  - The Met Office issues a warning for what is expected to be the coldest January night since 2010. Temperatures fall to −14 °C in parts of Scotland, while the following night (17 January) is the coldest of the winter for many places.
  - Giving evidence to the inquiry into the Post Office scandal, Paul Patterson, the chief executive of Fujitsu Europe, says the company has a "moral obligation" to contribute to compensation for sub-postmasters wrongly prosecuted as a result of its faulty IT software, and apologises for the impact the scandal had on those affected by it.
- 17 January
  - Data from the Office for National Statistics shows a slight increase in inflation for December 2023, with a rise to 4% compared to 3.9% in November.
  - Broadcaster and football executive Eniola Aluko threatens to take legal action after receiving online abuse from footballer Joey Barton.
  - Buckingham Palace confirms that King Charles III is to undergo surgery for an enlarged prostate, while Catherine, Princess of Wales is in hospital for abdominal surgery, keeping them away from public engagements for a while.
  - The current session of the 7th Northern Ireland Assembly is suspended following the failure of Democratic Unionist Party to support nominations to elect Mike Nesbitt (UUP) or Patsy McGlone (SDLP) to the role of Speaker of the Northern Ireland Assembly.
  - The Safety of Rwanda (Asylum and Immigration) Bill passes its third reading in the House of Commons with MPs voting 320–276 in favour of the bill.
- 18 January
  - The UK Statistics Authority rebukes the prime minister for misleading the public over the backlog of asylum applications, which he said in a social media post had been cleared, while several thousand still remained. The UKSA says the allegation could have affected public trust in the government.
  - A newborn girl is found in a shopping bag in Newham, London. It is thought that she was less than an hour old when she was found.
  - The legal deadline to form a Northern Ireland Executive. On the same day, over 150,000 public sector workers stage a general strike across Northern Ireland.
- 19 January
  - The Met Office issues a warning for high winds and heavy rain ahead of the arrival of Storm Isha.
  - Tata Steel confirms it is cutting 2,800 jobs. It will close its blast furnaces at Port Talbot and replace them with an electric arc furnace, which produces less CO_{2} but requires fewer workers.
  - The bodies of four people are found at a house in Costessey, near Norwich. All four people are believed to have been known to each other.
  - Prince Harry withdraws his libel claim against Associated Newspapers, publisher of the Mail on Sunday, over an article concerning his security arrangements during a visit to the UK.
  - A senior civil servant at the Department for Work and Pensions tells MPs that the UK government has stopped suspending Universal Credit claims flagged up as suspicious by an artificial intelligence fraud detector.
  - The European Court of Human Rights announces that Ireland launched legal action against the United Kingdom on 17 January over the Northern Ireland Troubles (Legacy and Reconciliation) Act 2023 that gives amnesty to all those accused of killings during the Troubles.
- 20 January
  - A Royal Navy investigation is launched following a collision between the British warships HMS Chiddingfold and HMS Bangor at a port in Bahrain.
  - A speech to the Fabian Society conference by Shadow Foreign Secretary David Lammy is interrupted by pro-Palestinian protestors.
- 21 January
  - Weather alerts, including two amber warnings, are issued for the entire UK as Storm Isha brings winds of up to 99 mph.
  - A technical fault prevents some Tesco grocery orders from being fulfilled.
  - A spokesman for Sarah, Duchess of York confirms she has been diagnosed with melanoma following the removal of a cancerous mole during treatment for breast cancer, and is undergoing further investigation. She is the third member of the royal family to undergo a medical procedure in under a week.
- 22 January
  - Two deaths are reported in the aftermath of Storm Isha, while tens of thousands of homes remain without power, and transport services face ongoing disruption. A new storm – Storm Jocelyn – is expected to hit parts of the UK tomorrow.
  - After the Royal Mail proposes that its deliveries should be made from Monday to Friday only, Downing Street states that the government would not support such a move, with the Prime Minister expressing a view that Saturday deliveries provide "flexibility and convenience".
  - Consultancy firm Cornwall Insight forecasts that energy bills will fall by 16% in April, saving the average household around £300 a year.
  - The UK and US launch fresh air strikes against Houthi targets in Yemen.
  - The UK's Charity Commission launches an investigation into antisemitic speeches given by members of the Iranian Revolutionary Guard to students at a UK-based Islamic charity, which included chants of "death to Israel".
- 23 January
  - Data from the Office for National Statistics indicates government borrowing in December was at £7.8bn, a fall from £16.2bn in December 2022, and the lowest since 2019.
  - Sunak tells Parliament the UK will not hesitate to launch further air strikes against Houthi rebels if they continue to attack shipping targets in the Red Sea, but does not seek confrontation with the group.
  - Most of the UK is placed under a Met Office yellow weather warning for high winds as Storm Jocelyn arrives.
  - 2023 Nottingham attacks: Valdo Calocane admits three counts of manslaughter and three of attempted murder.
- 24 January
  - Sir Patrick Sanders, the Chief of the General Staff, warns that the UK should train a "citizen army" ready to fight a war on land in the future, highlighting Russia as a potential threat and the steps being taken by other European countries to put their populations on a "war footing".
  - Ofcom publish plans to reform Royal Mail with the options of reducing postal deliveries from six to five or three days a week, or delaying the time the service takes to fulfil its deliveries.
  - Andy Street, the Mayor of the West Midlands, announces that he and his Manchester counterpart, Andy Burnham, are to meet Mark Harper, the Secretary of State for Transport, to discuss proposals for a privately funded alternative to the abandoned Manchester leg of HS2.
  - The UK is to lend several pieces of the Ghana crown jewels back to Ghana 150 years after looting them from the court of the Asante king.
- 25 January
  - The UK government announces fresh plans to ban the sale of zombie knives, with legislation taking effect from the autumn.
  - Lloyds Banking Group announces plans to cut around 1,600 positions from its branch staff in a reorganisation that it says is because more customers are banking online.
- 26 January
  - Buckingham Palace confirms that King Charles III has been admitted to hospital for treatment for an enlarged prostate.
  - Jürgen Klopp, currently the longest-serving manager in the Premier League, announces he is departing as manager of Liverpool F.C. after the conclusion of the 2023–24 season, and taking a break from football management.
- 27 January
  - The UK government suspends funding for the UN agency for Palestinian refugees, UNRWA, after the organisation sacked several officials reported to have been involved in the 7 October attacks on Israel.
  - Kemi Badenoch, the business secretary, asks Henry Staunton to step down as chair of Post Office Limited after 13 months in the role, as the government moves to strengthen governance at the Post Office in the wake of the long-running Horizon IT scandal.
  - John Lewis & Partners announce further cuts to the number of its staff over the coming five years, with The Guardian reporting up to 11,000 jobs could go.
  - The British Association of Dermatologists warns against the use of skincare products by children as young as eight, saying that to do so could leave them with irreversible skin damage.
- 28 January
  - The hottest UK temperature in January is provisionally recorded by the Met Office, with a peak of 19.6 °C (67.3 °F) at Kinlochewe, Scottish Highlands, more than a degree higher than the previous record in 2003.
  - The UK government announces plans to ban disposable vapes in an attempt to tackle the growing number of children taking up vaping.
- 29 January
  - The King and the Princess of Wales are both discharged from hospital.
  - Laurence Fox loses a High Court libel case with social media users he called paedophiles.
  - Reporting on cases in family courts in England and Wales is extended to a further 16 venues following a trial at three locations.
  - A University College London study of five cases of Alzheimer's disease suggests they could have been caused by a treatment in which the patients were injected with growth hormones from dead people, a treatment that was withdrawn in the mid-1980s.
- 30 January
  - Lucy Letby has her initial request for permission to appeal against seven murder convictions and six attempted murder convictions refused by the Court of Appeal.
  - HSBC is fined £57.4m by the Bank of England for "serious failings" over its measures to protect customer deposits.
  - The ONS publishes its latest forecast of UK population, suggesting that the number of people in the UK could rise from 67 to 73.7 million by 2036, driven by strong immigration.
- 31 January
  - Post-Brexit controls on food, plant and animal imports to Britain from the EU come into force.
  - 2024 Northern Ireland Executive Formation: Details of a deal between the UK government and the Democratic Unionist Party (DUP) to restore devolution in Northern Ireland are published.
  - Nine people, including three police officers, are taken to hospital following an attack using what is described as a "corrosive substance" on a car in Clapham, south west London. The suspect is named as Abdul Shakoor Ezedi, a 35-year-old man from the "Newcastle area".

=== February ===
- 1 February
  - A ban on owning an American XL Bully dog comes into force in England and Wales. It is now a criminal offence to own one of the dogs unless the owner has successfully applied for the dog to be exempt.
  - The Bank of England holds interest rates at 5.25%.
  - Climate activist Greta Thunberg appears at Westminster Magistrates' Court, charged with breaching section 14 of the Public Order Act 1986. Her case, and that of four co-defendants, is thrown out the following day.
  - COVID-19 vaccination in the United Kingdom: The first private service for COVID-19 vaccination begins rolling out to pharmacies around the UK, allowing those who are under 65 to receive the latest booster.
- 2 February
  - Senior Labour MP Darren Jones confirms that the party has ditched its commitment to spend £28bn a year on green investment schemes if it wins the next general election.
  - The killers of 16-year-old transgender girl Brianna Ghey are named as Scarlett Jenkinson and Eddie Ratcliffe, both aged 15 at the time of the murder in February 2023. They are sentenced at Manchester Crown Court to minimum terms of 22 and 20 years, respectively.
  - Water UK, the umbrella trade organisation for the UK's water companies, says that the average annual water bill is expected to increase by 6% in England and Wales from April, an average rise of £27 to £473.
- 3 February
  - 2024 Northern Ireland Executive formation:
    - The Northern Ireland Assembly meets to elect a new Speaker. Edwin Poots, a former leader of the DUP, is chosen to be the Assembly's 7th Speaker.
    - The Northern Ireland Executive is restored after the DUP ends its two-year boycott; Sinn Féin's Michelle O'Neill is appointed First Minister, becoming the first nationalist politician to hold the post, while the DUP's Emma Little-Pengelly is appointed deputy.
  - A third round of joint UK–US air strikes are launched against Houthi rebels, targeting three sites in Yemen. Defence Secretary Grant Shapps says the latest strikes are "not an escalation" of the conflict.
  - Esther Martin, a 68-year-old woman, is killed by dogs while visiting her grandson for the weekend in Jaywick, near Clacton-on-Sea, Essex.
- 4 February – CCTV footage of alkali attack suspect Abdul Shakoor Ezedi in a Tesco store is shown by the police, as a reward of £20,000 is offered for information leading to his capture.
- 5 February
  - Buckingham Palace announces that King Charles III has been diagnosed with cancer and will postpone public duties while undergoing treatment.
  - The Met Office issues a yellow weather warning for snow for large parts of north Wales, and northern and central England, for 8 February as unseasonably mild temperatures are replaced by colder weather.
  - A 16-year-old boy is found guilty of plotting to launch a terrorist attack at the Isle of Wight Festival following a trial at Kingston Crown Court.
  - The UK government launches a six-week consultation on plans for Martyn's Law, which would make provisions to better protect the public against potential acts of terrorism.
- 6 February – Around eight million people on means tested benefits begin to receive the final scheduled cost-of-living payment from the UK government, as Sunak tells the BBC the financial pressures on households are beginning to ease.
- 7 February
  - The government announces that dentists will be offered a £20,000 bonus to work in the areas of England with the poorest access to NHS care.
  - Data published by Halifax Bank indicates that UK house prices increased by 2.5% in January 2024 when compared to the same month in 2023.
  - The Met Office issues two amber snow warnings for the following day covering north Wales, north-west Shropshire, the Peak District and south Pennines.
- 8 February
  - The UK government confirms that more than 100 school buildings containing reinforced autoclaved aerated concrete will be rebuilt or refurbished.
  - Sir Keir Starmer insists he has no choice but to ditch Labour's £28 billion a year green investment pledge.
- 9 February
  - Weather warnings remain in place as snow and rain continue to fall across the UK.
  - Police tell reporters they believe that Abdul Shakoor Ezedi may have drowned in the River Thames, based on CCTV of the suspect at Chelsea Bridge.
  - The Duke of Sussex settles his remaining phone hacking claims against Mirror Group Newspapers, with the newspaper agreeing to pay his legal costs along with around £300,000 in compensation.
- 10 February
  - Police begin a search of the River Thames for the body of Abdul Shakoor Ezedi, the Clapham chemical attack suspect.
  - A light aircraft crashes into the garden of a property in Bodffordd, Anglesey. The male pilot, who was the only person on board, is taken to hospital by air ambulance.
  - In the first statement to be released since his cancer diagnosis, Charles III thanks the public for their messages of support.
- 11 February – British journalist Clare Rewcastle Brown accuses Malaysia of seeking "political revenge" for her reporting after a court jailed her in absentia for criminal defamation of a Malaysian royal.
- 12 February
  - Azhar Ali, the Labour Party's Rochdale by-election candidate, is suspended from the party over comments about Israel and Jewish people. He will however remain on the ballot as the Labour candidate, as it is too late to replace him under electoral law.
  - Three apologises after three days of outages that left around 12,000 people without mobile signals and data.
  - Child killer Colin Pitchfork will be reconsidered for parole after successfully challenging a Parole Board decision to refuse him parole on the grounds he poses too much of a risk if released from prison.
- 13 February
  - A catastrophic loss of seabird numbers is reported by the RSPB and the British Trust for Ornithology, due to the spread of H5N1 bird flu.
  - Police begin an investigation into reports of antisemitism during a performance by comedian Paul Currie at the Soho Theatre in London, which left Jewish audience members feeling "unsafe" and "threatened".
  - Labour leader Keir Starmer insists he took "decisive action" over comments made by Rochdale by-election candidate Azhar Ali.
  - Cosmetics retailer The Body Shop enters administration, putting more than 2,200 jobs at risk.
  - Data from the Office for National Statistics indicates that the average annual increase in employee earnings (excluding bonuses) was 6.2%, using data from the final three months of 2023.
- 14 February
  - Office for National Statistics data shows that UK inflation remained at 4% in January 2024, despite a slight fall in food prices and a rise in energy prices.
  - Train drivers' union ASLEF announces that drivers at five train operators – Chiltern, c2c, East Midlands, Northern and TransPennine – have voted for a further six months of industrial action.
  - Food delivery drivers with companies including Uber Eats, Just Eat and Deliveroo stage a five-hour strike between 5pm and 10pm over pay and conditions.
- 15 February
  - The UK is confirmed to be in a recession, after the economy shrank by 0.3% between October and December, having already contracted between July and September 2023.
  - The new names of London's six Overground lines are revealed, with significant changes to the look of the famous Tube map set to take place. From September the six lines will be known as Lioness, Mildmay, Windrush, Weaver, Suffragette and Liberty.
- 16 February
  - 2024 Wellingborough by-election: Labour's Gen Kitchen takes the Conservative Peter Bone's former seat, which he had held with a majority of more than 18,000. The swing of 28.5% is the second largest swing from Conservative to Labour at a by-election since the Second World War.
  - 2024 Kingswood by-election: Labour's Damien Egan overturns an 11,220 Conservative majority to win Conservative Chris Skidmore's former seat.
  - Data from the Office for National Statistics shows a 3.4% increase in retail sales during January 2024, largely fuelled by food shopping and the January sales.
  - Amina Noor, who took a three-year-old British girl to Kenya for female genital mutilation in 2005, is sentenced to seven years in prison following a trial at the Old Bailey. She becomes the first person to be convicted in the UK for assisting a non-UK person to carry out the practice.
  - Prince William announces plans to build 24 homes on Duchy of Cornwall land to help tackle homelessness. The prince wants to end homelessness as part of a major five-year campaign launched in 2023.
- 18 February – Senior police officers condemn "sexist and homophobic" comments made online about Karen Findlay, the newly appointed deputy chief constable of British Transport Police, following news of her promotion.
- 19 February
  - gov.uk updates the Royal Cypher Crown, replacing Queen Elizabeth II's St Edward's Crown with the Tudor Crown used by King Charles III.
  - Following a trial at Canterbury Crown Court, Senegalese national Ibrahima Bah is found guilty of the manslaughter of four migrants when the boat he was steering ran into trouble in the English Channel. Bah had agreed to steer the boat in exchange for a free crossing in December 2022.
  - Thomas Salton of Basildon, Essex becomes the first person in the UK to be convicted of possession and intent to supply nitrous oxide, and is sentenced to four months in prison.
- 20 February
  - Police announce that a body recovered from the River Thames is believed to be that of Abdul Shakoor Ezedi because of the distinctive clothing the deceased person was wearing.
  - The Medicines and Healthcare products Regulatory Agency announces that cough syrups containing codeine linctus will no longer be available in the UK without a prescription amid concerns they can become addictive.
  - The Body Shop announces the closure of half of its 198 UK stores, with closures set to begin immediately; the company's head office will also be reduced in size.
- 21 February
  - An Opposition day House of Commons debate calling for a ceasefire in Gaza descends into chaos after Speaker Sir Lindsay Hoyle breaks with Parliamentary convention to allow a vote on a Labour amendment calling for an "immediate humanitarian ceasefire" over the scheduled SNP motion calling for an "immediate ceasefire". The decision leads to protests from both Conservative and SNP MPs, who walk out of the House, leaving Labour's motion to be nodded through when the other two parties do not take part in the vote. Amid calls for his resignation, Hoyle says that he allowed the House to vote on the Labour motion so MPs could express their view on "the widest range of propositions" and was trying to protect MPs' safety.
  - A test-firing of the Trident nuclear missile system from a Royal Navy submarine is reported to have failed, for the second time in a row.
  - The UK freezes the assets of six Russian prison bosses after the death of activist Alexei Navalny in a penal colony the previous week.
  - The UK quits the Energy Charter Treaty, which had allowed fossil fuel companies to sue governments over profits lost in the drive towards net zero.
  - Data from the Office for National Statistics shows a surplus in government finances of £16.7bn in January 2024, more than double the figure for January 2023.
- 22 February
  - More than 60 MPs have signed a House of Commons motion calling for the resignation of Speaker Sir Lindsay Hoyle.
  - A further 50 sanctions against Russia are announced, aimed at restricting those supplying its military with munitions such as rocket launchers, missiles and explosives.
  - Employees of a company contracted by the Home Office are suspended after a baby's birth certificate was returned to the parents with the place of birth, Israel, crossed out.
  - The UK government announces that legislation will be introduced to clear hundreds of sub-postmasters in England and Wales who were wrongly convicted as a result of the Horizon IT scandal.
- 23 February
  - Thousands of people in the Keyham area of Plymouth, Devon are evacuated as an unexploded World War II bomb is moved by military convoy for disposal at sea. The bomb was discovered in a garden three days prior. This is also the first time that the UK Emergency Alert System is used in a live situation.
  - Ofgem confirms that the average annual energy bill will fall by £238 from April to £1,690, its lowest rate for two years.
  - Shamima Begum loses her legal bid to overturn the decision to revoke her UK citizenship.
  - Ibrahima Bah is sentenced to nine years and six months in prison.
  - The Cabinet Office confirms that Paula Vennells has been formally stripped of her CBE for "bringing the honours system into disrepute".
  - A body found in the River Thames is formally identified as that of Abdul Shakoor Ezedi.
- 24 February
  - Police are called to Willy's Chocolate Experience in Glasgow after the event – which was advertised as an immersive and interactive family experience using AI generated images – turns out to be a largely empty warehouse with a few props and decorations; attendees label the event a "scam" and "farce". In the following week, photos and videos from the shambolic event go viral online, garnering international media attention.
  - Conservative MP and a former Deputy Chairman Lee Anderson has the party whip suspended over his allegations that "Islamists" have "got control" of London Mayor Sadiq Khan.
  - Another round of joint UK–US air strikes are carried out against Houthi rebels.
- 25 February – The Post Office has hired investigators, including some former police officers, to look at the work of its own investigation into the Horizon IT scandal.
- 27 February
  - Prince William unexpectedly pulls out of attending a memorial service for King Constantine II of Greece citing personal matters.
  - South Staffordshire Council issue an enforcement notice on the landowner of The Crooked House requiring them to rebuild the building to its former dimensions and style as a public house.
  - While giving evidence under oath, former Post Office chairman Henry Staunton tells a parliamentary hearing on the Horizon IT scandal that current Post Office chair Nick Read is under internal investigation.
- 28 February
  - The Duke of Sussex loses a High Court challenge against the UK government's decision to downgrade his security status when he stopped being a working royal.
  - A study in the British Medical Journal links ultra-processed foods to 32 negative health impacts, including a higher risk of heart disease, cancer, type 2 diabetes, adverse mental health and early death.
  - Following a trial at the High Court in Glasgow, Iain Packer is found guilty of the April 2005 murder of Emma Caldwell, a sex worker whose body was found in woods five weeks after she disappeared from Glasgow. Packer, who is also convicted of 32 other offences against women, including rapes and sexual assaults, is sentenced to at least 36 years in prison, the second longest prison sentence to be handed out by a Scottish court.
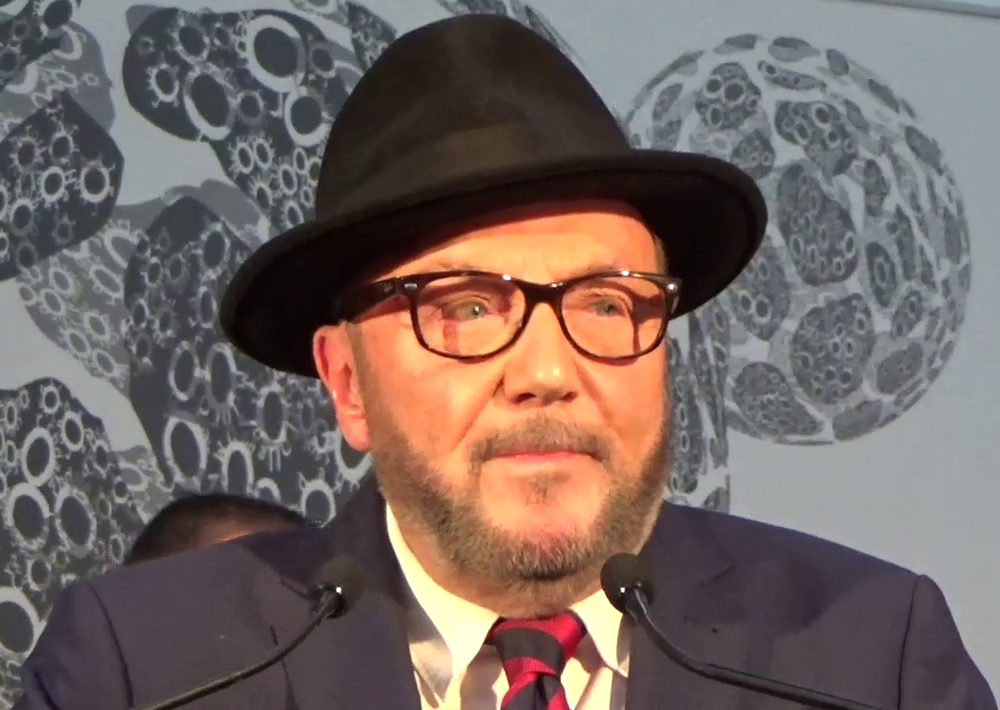
- George Galloway makes his victory speech after the Rochdale by-election
  29 February
  - 2024 Rochdale by-election: In an unusually chaotic by-election, former MP George Galloway resoundingly wins for the Workers Party of Britain, marking his return to parliament. Independent candidate David Tully comes second, with the Conservative candidate Paul Ellison coming third. Both the Labour and Green Party candidates were disowned by their respective parties.
  - Angiolini Inquiry: The public inquiry into the murder of Sarah Everard finds that her killer Wayne Couzens should never have been a police officer, and that opportunities to detect his offending were missed. The report contains 16 recommendations to prevent anyone "entrusted with the powers of a serving police officer" from abusing that trust again.
  - Michael Gove is placed under investigation by the Parliamentary Commissioner for Standards, in relation to his register of financial interests.
  - Sainsbury's announces it is cutting 1,500 jobs over three years in an attempt to save £1bn.

=== March ===
- 1 March
  - 35-year-old Marcus Osborne is given a whole life order, the most severe possible sentence available in England and Wales, for the "sadistic" murders of Steven Harnett and Katie Higton. He receives a further 10-year sentence for the rape and false imprisonment of another woman who was present at the scene, who cannot be named for legal reasons.
  - 29-year-old Joshua Jacques is sentenced to a minimum of 46 years in prison for murdering his girlfriend and three of her family members in a "sacrifice" at their home in Bermondsey, south London, in April 2022.
  - The Met Office reports that England and Wales had their warmest February on record this year, with an average of 7.5 °C recorded for England and 6.9 °C for Wales.
  - Scientists at the Centre for Environment, Fisheries and Aquaculture Science announce the discovery of a new species of sea slug off the southwest coast of England.
- 2 March
  - The 2024 BRIT Awards take place.
  - Northumberland National Park announces that the Sycamore Gap tree which was illegally felled last September is to go on public display.
- 4 March
  - The Princess of Wales is photographed for the first time since her surgery, with US celebrity news site TMZ publishing a photo of the princess riding as a passenger in a car being driven by her mother near Windsor Castle. Rumours and conspiracy theories over Catherine's whereabouts have surfaced in recent weeks as she hasn't been seen in public since late December.
  - Cadbury celebrate their 200th anniversary.
- 6 March
  - COVID-19 in the United Kingdom: Nearly 70 healthcare workers affected by long Covid sue the NHS and other employers for compensation. The total number of health workers affected by the condition in the UK is estimated at 5,000–10,000.
  - Chancellor Jeremy Hunt delivers the 2024 United Kingdom budget. Among the measures introduced are a 2% cut in National Insurance, the abolishing of non-dom status, a new tax on vapes, and a £3.4bn plan to modernise the NHS's IT system.
- 7 March – The Scottish Government announces an independent public inquiry into the police handling of the Emma Caldwell murder investigation.
- 8 March
  - Former Prime Minister Theresa May confirms she will step down as an MP before the next general election.
  - A report into the Troubles-era British Army spy known as Stakeknife concludes that he probably cost more lives than he saved.
  - London's Homerton Fertility Centre has its licence to operate suspended over "significant concerns" after three separate errors in which embryos were lost during the freezing process.
- 9 March
  - BBC News reports that seedlings have begun to sprout from genetic material recovered at the site of the felled Sycamore Gap Tree, offering hope that the iconic tree could be restored in the future.
  - The creation of the Elizabeth Emblem is announced. It will be awarded by the monarch to the next of kin of members of the United Kingdom emergency services who are killed on duty. It will be the civilian equivalent of the Elizabeth Cross.
  - The 10th pro-Palestinian march to be staged in central London since the beginning of the Israel–Gaza conflict takes place, with tens of thousands of protestors calling for an immediate ceasefire.
  - A man is arrested after a car crashes into the gates of Buckingham Palace in the early hours of the morning.
- 10 March
  - Kensington Palace releases the first official photograph of the Princess of Wales since she underwent abdominal surgery in January. However, hours later, four international photo agencies – Associated Press, Reuters, Getty Images and AFP – withdraw the photo from their services over concerns it has been photoshopped or AI generated, after an "inconsistency in alignment of Princess Charlotte's left hand" is noted along with various other signs of digital manipulation. Kensington Palace declines to comment on the photo, as speculation intensifies over why an altered photo has been published.
  - The Mail on Sunday serialises A Very Private School, Earl Spencer's memoirs of his schooldays at Maidwell Hall during the 1970s, in which he alleges that he was sexually abused by a female member of staff while a boarder at the school. Spencer also alleges the school's headmaster during his time there took sexual pleasure in beating the boys. In response, the school says it has referred the allegations to a "local authority designated officer".
- 11 March
  - Ashfield MP Lee Anderson defects from the Conservatives to Reform UK, becoming the party's first sitting Member of Parliament. Anderson was suspended from the Conservatives on 24 February after comments made on GB News saying Islamists had "got control" of London and its mayor Sadiq Khan.
  - In a post on X (Twitter), Catherine, Princess of Wales responds to speculation surrounding the previous day's photo and apologises for "any confusion the family photograph we shared yesterday caused". She confirms that the photo was doctored and admits she edited it, saying "I do occasionally experiment with editing".
  - The Office for National Statistics adds air fryers and vinyl records to the basket of goods it uses to calculate the cost of inflation, with vinyl music making a return after a thirty-year absence.
  - The Guardian alleges that Frank Hester, a major donor of the Conservative Party, said in 2019 that Diane Abbott "should be shot" and made him "want to hate all black women". Hester apologises for the comments, describing them as "rude" but "nothing to do with her gender nor colour of skin". A spokesman for the prime minister describes the remarks as "racist and wrong".
- 12 March – Figures from the Office for National Statistics suggests a fifth of the working age population, around 9.2 million adults between the ages of 16 and 64, were not in employment between November 2023 and January 2024.
- 13 March
  - Data from the Office for National Statistics indicates the UK economy grew by 0.2% in January 2024, largely fuelled by retail sales, both in the High Street and online.
  - Sunak tells Prime Minister's Questions he will not return £10m donated to the Conservative Party by Frank Hester, because he has apologised and "his remorse should be accepted".
  - Metro Bank announces it will cease seven day trading from 29 March, with 1,000 jobs also being lost by the company.
  - The UK government announces a scheme to offer failed asylum seekers £3,000 if they agree to move to Rwanda voluntarily.
- 14 March
  - Russia is reported to have jammed the GPS signal of an RAF plane carrying Defence Secretary Grant Shapps back to the UK from Poland the previous day for around 30 minutes as the plane flew near the border of the Russian territory of Kaliningrad.
  - Speaking in the House of Commons, Secretary of State for Levelling Up, Housing and Communities Michael Gove outlines the UK government's new definition of extremism, and names five groups that would be assessed against the new criteria. They are the British National Socialist Movement, Patriotic Alternative, the Muslim Association of Britain, CAGE and Muslim Engagement and Development. The new definition is criticised by civil liberties and community groups, while most of the groups named by Gove threaten legal action if they are added to the list.
  - A Royal Air Force plane carrying UK Defence Secretary Grant Shapps and several journalists experiences GPS signal jamming whilst flying near Kaliningrad Oblast, Russia. Mobile phone signals were also jammed during the flight.
  - Speaking to ITV News West Country, Sunak rules out 2 May as the date of the next general election.
  - The news website Tortoise Media reports that the Conservatives have received a further £5m in donations from Frank Hester that are yet to be declared.
- 16 March
  - Vaughan Gething is elected to lead Welsh Labour, and will become First Minister of Wales. He will be Wales's first black leader, and the first black person to lead a country in Europe.
  - Sainsbury's apologises to its online customers after a technical error meant that orders could not be fulfilled.
- 18 March – At Manchester Crown Court, Jacob Graham is sentenced to 13 years in prison together with a further five year extended period on licence for creating a "freedom encyclopaedia" containing details on how to build weapons for the purposes of terrorism.
- 19 March
  - At Southend Crown Court, 39-year-old Nicholas Hawkes, the first person in England and Wales to be convicted of cyberflashing, is sentenced to 66 weeks in prison. This new offence follows passage of the Online Safety Act, which came into effect on 31 January.
  - HMRC announces that its self-assessment helpline will be closed for six months of the year, with the line scheduled to close from 8 April to 30 September. Customers seeking help during that period will be forced to use an online chatbot.
  - The British Board of Film Classification updates its guidelines, meaning films containing scenes of sex or nudity are more likely to receive a 15 rather than a 12A rating going forward.
- 20 March
  - Inflation falls from 4% to 3.4%, its lowest rate since September 2021.
  - HMRC reverses the plan for its self-assessment helpline, announced the previous day, following criticism from the public and MPs.
  - The Senedd approves Vaughan Gething as the next First Minister of Wales.
  - The London Clinic, where the Princess of Wales underwent abdominal surgery, announces that "any breach" of patient confidentiality will be investigated after reports a member of staff tried to access her private records.
- 21 March
  - The Bank of England leaves interest rates unchanged at 5.25%, for the fifth time in a row.
  - A report published by the Parliamentary and Health Service Ombudsman recommends women born in the 1950s who were affected by the 2010 changes to the state pension age should receive compensation of between £1,000 and £2,900.
- 22 March
  - Following media speculation about her health, it is revealed that the Princess of Wales has been diagnosed with cancer and is undergoing treatment.
  - Wetherspoons reports an eightfold increase in pre-tax profits during the first six months of the 2023–24 financial year.
- 23 March – A report compiled by the Resolution Foundation indicates a rise in the number of people leaving work due to long-term health conditions, with the number of people inactive due to long-term health conditions rising from 2.1 million in 2019 to 2.8 million in October 2023, the longest sustained rise since 1994–1998 when records began. The UK is also the only country in the G7 not to return to pre-pandemic employment levels.
- 24 March – Avanti West Coast is to increase the fee for an overtime shift for its drivers by 380% following a deal with train drivers' union ASLEF.
- 26 March
  - Pizza retailer Papa John's announces the closure of 43 of its 450 UK outlets.
  - The High Court of Justice grants WikiLeaks founder Julian Assange a stay of extradition to the United States, and demands that the US not consider the death penalty against Assange if he is sent to the US to face espionage charges.
- 27 March – Provisional figures from the Home Office indicate that 4,644 migrants have crossed the English Channel in boats during the first three months of 2024.
- 28 March – BBC News publishes details of a 2016 draft report that implies the Post Office knew its defence case in the Horizon IT scandal was false, and that it had not made full disclosure to defendants.
- 29 March
  - Sir Jeffrey Donaldson resigns as leader of the Democratic Unionist Party after being charged with rape and other historical sexual offences. Gavin Robinson is appointed interim leader until a new leader can be elected.
  - Pouria Zeraati, an anti-Iranian regime journalist working for Iran International, is stabbed by a group of people in London. He is taken to hospital, where he is in stable condition.
- 30 March
  - First Minister of Northern Ireland Michelle O'Neill says she is determined the Stormont Assembly and Executive will continue to function following the resignation of Jeffrey Donaldson as DUP leader.
  - Cambridge beat Oxford to win both the 2024 men's and women's Boat Races, giving Cambridge their first consecutive men's victory and their seventh consecutive women's victory.
- 31 March
  - Charles III makes his first public appearance since being diagnosed with cancer when he attends the Easter Sunday service at Windsor.
  - The UK government says it will work alongside the Northern Ireland Executive to maintain stability at Stormont.

=== April ===
- 1 April
  - The cost of an average annual energy bill falls by £238 to £1,690 under the latest Ofgem price cap, its lowest for two years.
  - The cost of a TV licence increases by £10.50 from £159 to £169.50.
  - The National Living Wage rises from £10.42 to £11.44 per hour, and is extended to workers over 21.
- 2 April
  - Royal Mail stamp increases – 1st class standard stamp goes up by 10p to £1.35 and 2nd class standard increases by 10p to 85p. Other postage has increased too.
  - Three Britons, named as John Chapman, James Henderson and James Kirby, are identified as being among seven people working for the food charity World Central Kitchen, who were killed during air strikes in Gaza the previous day.
  - Data compiled by the British Retail Consortium indicates falling prices of sugar, jam and chocolate helped to reduce food inflation to its lowest level for two years in March.
- 3 April – The Liberal Democrats, Scottish National Party and former UK national security adviser Lord Ricketts call for an immediate suspension of the sale of arms to Israel following the World Central Kitchen air strikes.
- 4 April
  - Three former Supreme Court justices and more than 600 legal experts call for the UK government to end weapons sales to Israel, saying the UK risks breaking international law over a "plausible risk of genocide" in Gaza.
  - Foreign Secretary David Cameron rules out sending western troops to Ukraine since it would provide Russia with a "target".
  - At Leeds Crown Court, Piran Ditta Khan, who planned the 2005 robbery during which PC Sharon Beshenivsky was shot dead, is convicted of her murder. He is the last of the seven-member gang involved in the robbery to stand trial.
  - The deadline for installing new scanners at airports is extended, meaning airline passengers at major airports will continue to face limits on the amount of liquid they can carry in hand luggage.
  - The Met Office issues a yellow severe weather warning for wintry showers and high winds ahead of the arrival of Storm Kathleen, expected to reach the UK on 6 April.
- 5 April – John Tinniswood, a great-grandfather from Merseyside, officially becomes the world's oldest living man at the age of 111 years and 283 days.
- 6 April
  - Former Prime Minister Boris Johnson describes calls for the UK to end arms sales to Israel as "shameful".
  - Two planes collide at Heathrow Airport causing damage to both aircraft, but there are no injuries to people on board.
- 7 April
  - Deputy Prime Minister Oliver Dowden tells the BBC he still believes it is legal for the UK to sell arms to Israel.
  - Analysis by BBC News suggests that those running the Post Office were paid £19.4m during the 24 years of the Horizon IT scandal.
- 8 April
  - Westernmost parts of the UK experience a partial solar eclipse.
  - William Wragg steps down as vice chairman of the 1922 Committee of Tory MPs, after sharing MPs' personal phone numbers with someone on a dating app.
- 9 April
  - Widespread travel and other disruption is reported around the UK, following an exceptionally high tide combined with strong winds.
  - The BBC reports that security is to be increased at Champions League games, following threats from a pro-IS media channel.
  - Foreign Secretary David Cameron confirms that the UK will not suspend the sale of arms to Israel.
  - The governor of the Bank of England, Andrew Bailey and chief cashier Sarah John, present King Charles III with his banknotes.
- 10 April
  - A review into gender services carried out by paediatrician Dr Hilary Cass calls for gender services for young people to match the standards of other NHS care.
  - Five people are arrested after pro-Palestinian protestors spray red paint on the Ministry of Defence building in London.
  - Meta lowers the minimum age for WhatsApp users in the UK and EU from 16 to 13.
- 11 April
  - The Victoria and Albert Museum and British Museum return a number of artefacts to Ghana on long-term loan, more than 150 years after they were taken.
  - The Metropolitan Police says it will partly reinvestigate its decision to charge television presenter Caroline Flack with assaulting her boyfriend because "new witness evidence may be available".
- 12 April
  - Data from the Office for National Statistics shows the UK economy grew by 0.1% in February, which is attributed to increases in production and manufacturing.
  - The British government advises against all travel to Israel and Palestinian territories due to the imminent threat of an Iranian attack.
- 13 April
  - Former subpostmaster Alan Bates says he will consider raising funds to bring a private prosecution against Post Office bosses over the Horizon IT scandal.
  - I Am Maximus ridden by Paul Townend wins the 2024 Grand National.
  - Sunak condemns Iran's attack against Israel and says the UK is working to stabilise the situation.
- 14 April
  - Sunak confirms that RAF fighter jets shot down "a number of drones" fired at Israel by Iran.
  - Richard Lee, whose daughter Katrice Lee disappeared near a British military base in Paderborn, Germany, in 1981, says he will hand back his Army medals in protest at how the case was handled.
  - Lawyers representing around 250 survivors of the Manchester Arena bombing confirm plans to take legal action against MI5.
  - Charities supporting asylum seekers announce plans to launch legal challenges to moving people to Rwanda once legislation declaring it a safe country is passed in the coming days.
  - The Duke of Kent confirms he is stepping down as Colonel of the Scots Guards after 50 years, and handing the role over to the Duke of Edinburgh.
  - The UK experiences its warmest temperature of 2024 so far, with 21.8 °C recorded in the village of Writtle, near Chelmsford, Essex.
- 15 April
  - Sunak urges "all sides" to "show restraint" after Iran's attack on Israel.
  - A report by the Resolution Foundation calls for changes to Universal Credit to take into account an aging population with health problems.
- 16 April
  - Figures show the rate of UK unemployment rose to 4.2% between December 2023 and March 2024, its highest level for six months.
  - EasyJet cancels all flights to and from Tel Aviv for the whole of the summer, citing safety concerns following Iran's drone and missile attack on Israel.
  - A Muslim student at Michaela Community School loses a High Court challenge against a ban on prayer rituals.
  - The Tobacco and Vapes Bill passes by 383 votes to 67, banning anyone born after 2009 from legally buying cigarettes in the UK.
- 17 April
  - Figures indicate that UK inflation fell by 0.2% in March to 3.2%, with falling food prices the main contributing factor.
  - Scientists find in the Westbury Formation fossil remains of the Ichthyotitan, the largest marine reptile ever.
- 18 April
  - BBC News reports that documents seen by its journalists reveal the full extent of the number of medical trials using infected blood products on children during the 1970s and 1980s.
  - Team GB and ParalympicsGB release their kits for the 2024 Olympic Games and 2024 Paralympics.
- 19 April
  - Retail sales in the UK saw zero growth in March as consumers cut back on their spending due to ongoing financial pressures brought about by the cost of living crisis.
  - In a speech on welfare, Sunak sets out plans to tackle what he describes as the UK's "sick note culture" by stripping GPs in England of their authority to sign people off work. In response Labour says the government has failed to deliver a healthy nation or economy and has "run out of ideas".
  - Research by Ofcom indicates that almost a quarter of children aged between five and seven have their own smartphones, with two fifths of them regularly using messaging services such as WhatsApp, even though it has a minimum age restriction of 13.
  - Coventry Building Society agrees a potential takeover deal with the Co-Operative Bank worth £780m.
  - The Metropolitan Police apologises to antisemitism charity leader Gideon Falter, who was threatened with arrest by one of its officers for being near a pro-Palestinian march on 13 April, and who was described by the officer as being "openly Jewish".
  - The Grade II listed, 16th-century Burn Bullock, a former coaching inn, is badly damaged by fire.
- 20 April
  - Chris Stark, head of the Climate Change Committee, tells the BBC that Rishi Sunak has "set us back" on climate change, in contrast to the progress made under Theresa May and Boris Johnson. In response, a government spokesperson says: "We are the first major economy to halve greenhouse gas emissions since 1990 and have set into law one of the most ambitious 2035 climate change targets of any major economy".
  - Co-op Live, the UK's largest indoor arena seating 23,500 and costing £365m to build, opens in Manchester. The venue is forced to apologise, however, after cancelling some tickets to a test gig with Rick Astley and offers ticketholders affected tickets to another concert.
  - Dr Hilary Cass, the author of a report into gender identity services for young people, says she is "very angry" about "misinformation" spread regarding the report.
- 21 April – The 2024 London Marathon takes place.
- 22 April
  - Parliament passes the Safety of Rwanda Bill, with plans to deport the first asylum seekers to Kigali in July.
  - Newsreader Huw Edwards resigns from the BBC, nine months after being suspended following allegations of sexual misconduct and being admitted to hospital with "serious mental health issues".
  - The Metropolitan Police apologise to Doreen Lawrence after failing to provide information about a suspect in her son's murder.
  - Drivers at 16 train operators announce a series of one-day rolling strikes between 7 and 9 May.
  - Co-op Live announces the postponement of its opening events starring Peter Kay as the venue is not ready.
- 23 April
  - Office for National Statistics data indicates UK government borrowing was at £120.7bn in March 2024, lower than the figure for the same time the previous year, but £6.6bn higher than the government's forecasts.
  - Five migrants including a child are reported to have died attempting to cross the English Channel in a small boat, just hours after passage of the Rwanda Bill.
  - Sunak pledges an additional £500m to support Ukraine, on top of the £2.5bn allocated for this financial year.
  - Sunak announces "the biggest strengthening of our national defence in a generation, to meet the challenge of an increasingly dangerous world". He confirms that defence spending will increase from 2.3% of gross domestic product (GDP) to 2.5% by 2030, meaning an extra £75bn for the military over the next six years.
- 24 April
  - Four people are injured and several vehicles are damaged as a number of runaway horses – one seemingly covered in blood – escape from the Household Cavalry and gallop through central London.
  - Three people are injured and one arrested after a stabbing incident at a school in Ammanford, Wales.
  - Unions say that 70,000 civil service jobs will be cut in order to fund an increase in defence spending. Chancellor Hunt says that cuts in public spending will cost "a great deal less" than allowing Russia to win.
- 25 April
  - Labour pledges to renationalise most rail services within five years if it wins the next general election.
  - The SNP's power-sharing deal with the Scottish Greens collapses.
  - Shoplifting is reported to have hit a record high in 2023, with more than 430,000 offences recorded. This figure is up by more than one-third compared to 2022, and likely represents a fraction of the true number of incidents.
  - In the High Court, Laurence Fox is ordered to pay £180,000 in libel damages to former Stonewall trustee Simon Blake and drag artist Crystal.
  - The Environment Minister, Robbie Moore says "Additional time will be needed to efficiently and effectively roll out the schemes across the UK," as the Cash for Bottle deposit scheme is delayed until October 2027.
  - Moroccan asylum seeker Ahmed Alid is convicted of the murder of Terence Carney, who was stabbed multiple times in an attack at Hartlepool in October 2023.
  - Gary Roden resigns as the general manager of Co-op Live following a series of problems and delays at the venue.
- 26 April
  - A trial begins of the first personalised melanoma vaccine, based on mRNA, the same technology as current COVID vaccines.
  - Buckingham Palace announces that King Charles will resume his public duties from the following week after making good progress with his cancer treatment.
  - An inquest into the 2020 Reading stabbings concludes they could have been avoided but for problems with the sharing of intelligence between authorities.
  - A teenage girl from Greater Manchester is believed to be the first child to be subject to a stalking order after a prolonged campaign of harassment against a family in the area.
  - Two British men are charged with helping Russian intelligence following a suspected arson attack on a Ukrainian business in London.
- 27 April – Conservative MP and ex-minister Daniel Poulter defects to Labour, saying he has concerns over the NHS and other public services.
- 28 April – Irish Taoiseach Simon Harris looks at creating legislation to allow the return of asylum seekers to the UK after figures show that 80% of recent asylum seekers arriving in Ireland are people who crossed from Northern Ireland.
- 29 April – 2024 Scottish government crisis: First Minister, Humza Yousaf, announces he will resign as both leader of the SNP and first minister of Scotland when his successor is chosen.
- 30 April
  - Brexit: Physical checks begin on meat and dairy products, plants, seeds, and a number of other goods imported from the European Union, which are expected to cost British firms about £330m per year.
  - 2024 Hainault sword attack: A 14-year-old boy is killed and four other people are wounded by a man wielding a sword in Hainault, northeast London. The attacker is arrested and police say the incident is not terror-related.
  - Rwanda asylum plan:
    - Home Office figures suggest that of the 5,700 asylum seekers earmarked for deportation to Rwanda, only 2,143 can immediately be located.
    - BBC News reports that the UK has sent its first failed asylum seeker to Rwanda after he voluntarily agreed to go.
  - Charles III returns to his public duties for the first time since his cancer diagnosis with a visit to University College Hospital's Macmillan Cancer Centre. He also becomes patron of Cancer Research UK.
  - A bid by an Abu Dhabi based consortium to buy The Telegraph collapses, meaning the newspaper is for sale again.

=== May ===
- 1 May – Manchester's Co-op Live venue postpones its opening for a third time.
- 2 May
  - In England and Wales, the 2024 local elections take place, along with the 2024 London Assembly election, the 2024 London mayoral election, various other mayoral elections and police and crime commissioner elections. The Blackpool South by-election is also held.
  - Forty-five protesters are arrested after obstructing a coach moving asylum seekers in Peckham to the Bibby Stockholm.
  - John Swinney is set to become the next SNP leader and first minister after Kate Forbes confirms she will not seek the party's leadership.
  - Goldman Sachs becomes the first firm to remove the cap on bankers' bonuses following the 2023 change in UK law regarding bonuses.
  - The Organisation for Economic Co-operation and Development forecasts that the UK will have the slowest economic growth among the world's developed nations during 2025.
  - A man is remanded in custody charged with the murder of Daniel Anjorin, as well as two counts of attempted murder.
  - King Charles III is presented with his Coronation scroll, the first to be made without the use of animal skin.
- 3 May
  - With 90% of council election results announced, the Conservatives have lost over 400 council seats, while Labour regains control of Hartlepool, Redditch, Rushmoor and Thurrock Councils.
  - Ben Houchen wins the Tees Valley mayoral election, retaining the seat for the Conservatives, while Labour win mayoral elections in the East Midlands, North East and York and North Yorkshire.
  - Chris Webb wins the 2024 Blackpool South by-election, with a 26% swing to Labour.
  - Research carried out by the University of Leicester suggests squirrels may have passed leprosy on to mediaeval humans in the UK.
- 4 May
  - 2024 London mayoral election: Labour's Sadiq Khan secures a third term as Mayor of London with 44% of the vote, beating the Conservative Susan Hall on 33%.
  - 2024 West Midlands mayoral election: Labour's Richard Parker narrowly defeats the Conservative incumbent Andy Street to become Mayor of the West Midlands.
  - 2024 Greater Manchester mayoral election: Labour's Andy Burnham secures a third term as Mayor of Greater Manchester with almost two-thirds of the votes cast.
- 5 May – With all votes counted, the results from the local elections in England are: Labour 1,158 (+186), Liberal Democrat 522 (+104), Conservative 515 (−474), Independents and others 228 (+93), Green 181 (+74), Residents' Association 48 (+11), Workers Party of Britain 4 (+4), Reform UK 2 (+2).
- 6 May
  - King Charles III, celebrates the first anniversary of his coronation.
  - The NHS will roll out laser interstitial thermal therapy (known as LITT) next month in England to help reduce seizures for patients with epilepsy that cannot be controlled by standard anti-seizure drugs.
  - John Swinney is confirmed as Leader of the Scottish National Party after being unopposed in the leadership election, and begins his second tenure in the post.
  - Heineken announces plans to reopen UK pubs that were previously closed and to invest £39m in refurbishments.
  - Kyren Wilson wins the 2024 World Snooker Championship, defeating Jak Jones 18 frames to 14.
- 7 May
  - Farmers call for a vaccine to be developed against bluetongue disease after 126 cases are reported in cattle and sheep, spread by infected midges blown from northern Europe.
  - China is suspected of hacking the UK armed forces payroll.
  - The Green Party's Siân Berry, who was re-elected in the 2024 London Assembly election, is criticised for resigning three days later to hand her seat to Zoë Garbett, who lost in the same election with 5.8% of the vote. Berry steps down from the post in order to run as Green candidate in Brighton Pavilion, where current MP Caroline Lucas is standing down at the next election.
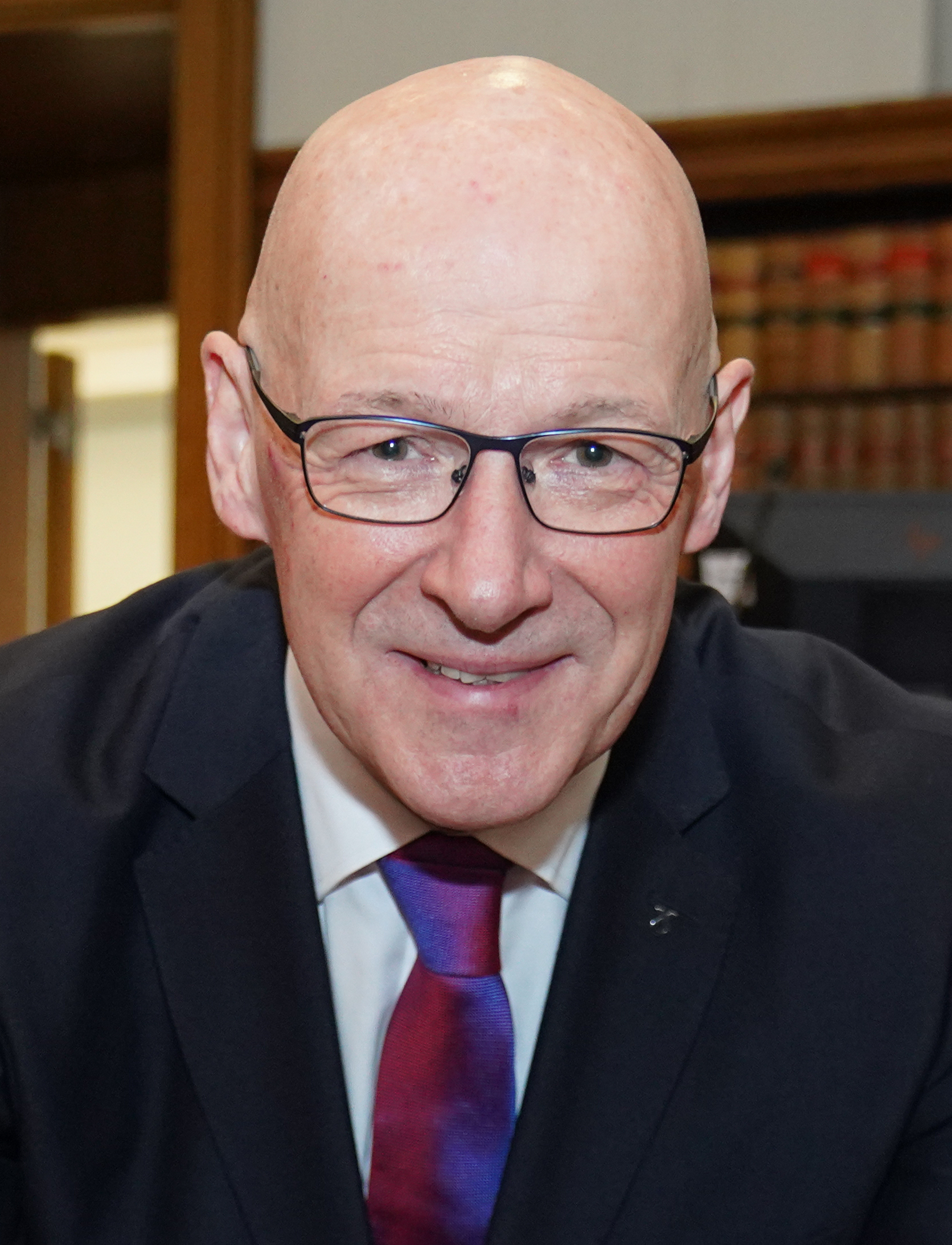
- John Swinney after being appointed First Minister of Scotland
  8 May
  - John Swinney is sworn in as Scotland's seventh first minister at a ceremony at the Court of Session in Edinburgh.
  - Swinney appoints Kate Forbes as Scotland's Deputy First Minister.
  - Natalie Elphicke, MP for Dover, defects from the Conservatives to Labour as Prime Minister's Questions begins in the Commons, saying in a statement: "Under Rishi Sunak, the Conservatives have become a byword for incompetence and division."
  - Former cricketer Monty Panesar of the Workers Party, withdraws his candidacy to stand for election as the next MP for Ealing Southall in the 2024 general election as he needs more time to "mature and find my political feet".
- 9 May
  - The Bank of England keeps interest rates on hold at 5.25% for the sixth time in a row. The governor Andrew Bailey says the committee needs to "see more evidence" of falling inflation before cutting the base rate.
  - The UK government announces that legislation will be brought forward to ban sex offenders in England and Wales from changing their names to avoid detection.
- 10 May
  - The UK economy is reported to have moved out of recession, with 0.6% growth between January and March, the fastest rate for two years.
  - 75-year-old Piran Ditta Khan is sentenced to life imprisonment, with a minimum term of 40 years, for the shooting dead of police officer Sharon Beshenivsky during an armed robbery in 2005.
  - Two elderly women from climate protest group Just Stop Oil target Magna Carta in the British Library, attempting to smash its glass container with a hammer and chisel. The documents themselves are undamaged.
  - The Liberty, a device that allows cancer patients to take some blood tests at home and upload the data, is given approval for use at 12 cancer treatment sites within the NHS.
  - The Co-op Live arena says it is ready to open after completing safety checks, with Elbow scheduled to perform as the opening act on 14 May.
- 11 May – The hottest day of the year so far is recorded by the Met Office, with temperatures peaking at 25.9 °C (78.6 °F) in Herstmonceux, East Sussex.
- 12 May
  - Foreign Secretary David Cameron tells the BBC's Sunday with Laura Kuenssberg that a ban on the sale of UK weapons to Israel would only strengthen Hamas.
  - Yellow weather warnings are in place for heavy rain and flooding as the brief hot spell comes to an end.
- 13 May
  - The first new Royal Warrant Holders are issued by King Charles III and Queen Camilla.
  - Charles III hands over the role of commander-in-chief of the Army Air Corps to Prince William after 32 years in the role.
  - Changes to the welfare system require people on Universal Credit to work 18 hours a week, with those on less than 16 hours a week required to look for more work.
- 14 May – Manchester's Co-op Live venue finally opens after being beset by problems that delayed its launch.
- 15 May
  - The UK Health Security Agency advises residents of south Devon to boil their tap water following 22 cases of infection caused by the parasite cryptosporidium.
  - English Premier League football clubs are to vote on whether to scrap video assisted refereeing (VAR) at their annual general meeting in June.
- 16 May
  - At a campaign event in Essex, Labour leader Keir Starmer outlines the first steps his party will take if they win the next general election. These are: economic stability, a cut in NHS waiting times in England, a new Border Security Command, the establishment of Great British Energy, a crackdown on antisocial behaviour in England, and 6,500 more teachers in England.
  - The BBC reports that HPV vaccinations in young people are now so successful that cervical cancer "could be eradicated in the near future."
  - South West Water says it believes a faulty valve may have allowed a parasite to enter the water network.
- 17 May
  - Moroccan asylum seeker Ahmed Alid is sentenced to life imprisonment, with a minimum term of 45 years, for the murder of 70-year-old Terence Carney in Hartlepool. Mrs Justice Cheema-Grubb tells Alid: "The murder of Terence Carney was a terrorist act in which you hoped to influence the British government. You hoped to frighten the British people and undermine the freedoms they enjoy."
  - The UK Health Security Agency confirms the number of cases of cryptosporidiosis in south Devon has risen to 46.
  - Sir Paul McCartney has become the first billionaire British musician according to the 2024 Sunday Times Rich List.
- 18 May
  - South West Water tells residents in most of Brixham, south Devon they no longer have to boil water before drinking it, but continues to advise households in upper Brixham, Hillhead and Kingswear to do so.
  - The Met Office issues a weather warning for severe thunderstorms for Wales, south west England and the West Midlands.
  - A number of people are reported to be isolating on the cruise ship MV Ventura with gastrointestinal symptoms.
  - Technical problems result in customers being unable to use the M&S website and app for several hours.
  - Declassified documents clear the Welsh Guards of any responsibility in the Argentinian Air Force bombing of RFA Sir Galahad on 8 June 1982, leading to the biggest loss of British lives during the Falklands War; some had blamed the Welsh Guards for disobeying orders to leave the ship, where 48 crewmen were killed.
- 19 May – South West Water apologises after 30 households in south Devon were wrongly told they could stop boiling water.
- 20 May
  - The results of a public inquiry into the contaminated blood scandal are published. The report accuses doctors, the government, and the NHS of trying to cover-up mistakes, which led to over 3,000 deaths and 30,000 infections of hepatitis C and HIV, described by inquiry chair Sir Brian Langstaff as "a calamity."
  - The High Court grants permission to WikiLeaks founder Julian Assange to appeal against his extradition order to the US over the alleged leaking of military secrets.
  - Conservative MP Anthony Mangnall, whose constituency covers Brixham, calls for customers of South West Water to receive compensation they "deserve", following the recent outbreak of cryptosporidium.
- 21 May
  - In the Commons, Paymaster General John Glen lays out details of the compensation scheme for victims of the infected blood scandal, which is estimated to cost £10bn.
  - The High Court rules that the Duke of Sussex cannot broaden his legal action against News UK to include fresh allegations against Rupert Murdoch.
  - A 73-year-old British man named as Geoff Kitchen dies on a flight bound from London to Singapore, following severe turbulence on the plane, while several others are seriously injured.
  - Thames Valley Police announce that Matthew Trickett, who was charged last week under the National Security Act 2023, was found dead on 19 May while awaiting trial.
  - Online car retailer Cazoo goes into administration after a restructuring process in which several hundred jobs were lost.
- 22 May
  - The ONS reports that UK inflation fell to 2.3% in April, its lowest rate for nearly three years.
  - Ex-Post Office boss Paula Vennells breaks down in tears at the inquiry into the Horizon IT scandal, as she acknowledges that what she told MPs and colleagues in one meeting about prosecutions of sub-postmasters wasn't true.
  - Rishi Sunak announces that a general election will be held on 4 July.
  - A team of UK scientists announce a process for recycling cement that may reduce the amount of greenhouse gases emitted by the material.
- 24 May
  - Energy regulator Ofgem announces a £122 drop in the energy price cap for England, Wales and Scotland from July to September.
  - Child serial killer Lucy Letby is denied permission to appeal against her convictions.
  - Hyperia, the tallest and fastest rollercoaster in the UK, opens at Thorpe Park in Surrey.
  - 2024 general election: Senior Conservative MPs Michael Gove and Andrea Leadsom announce they are not standing for re-election. The total number of Conservatives confirming they will not stand again is now at 78, beating the previous record of 72 in 1997.
  - 2024 general election: Parliament is prorogued ahead of the general election.
- 25 May
  - RAF pilot Mark Long is killed after the Spitfire he was flying crashes near RAF Coningsby in Lincolnshire.
  - 2024 general election: Rishi Sunak announces a plan to bring back a form of mandatory national service for 18-year-olds if his party is re-elected.
  - Former chief scientific adviser to the government Sir Patrick Vallance, speaking at a panel event in Wales, says that another pandemic is "absolutely inevitable" and urges the next government to prepare for it, warning "we are not ready yet".
  - Manchester United defeat Manchester City 2–1 to win the 2024 FA Cup final.
- 26 May – British event rider Georgie Campbell dies after falling from her horse at the Bicton International Horse Trials in Devon.
- 27 May
  - 2024 general election: Lucy Allan, outgoing Conservative MP for Telford is suspended from her party for backing Alan Adams, the Reform UK candidate to be her replacement.
  - The RAF temporarily grounds its Spitfire planes following the fatal crash two days earlier.
  - The FBI is reported to be investigating the sale of hundreds of British Museum artefacts to buyers in the United States.
- 28 May – Diane Abbott is readmitted as a Labour MP, following her suspension the previous year.
- 30 May
  - 2024 general election: The Parliament elected in 2019 is dissolved.
  - Buckingham Palace confirms that Charles III will attend the 2024 Trooping the Colour ceremony.
- 31 May – BBC News reports that the Battle of Britain Memorial Flight will not fly as part of D-Day anniversary events following the death of Squadron Leader Mark Long.

=== June ===
- 3 June
  - The payment of around half a million Child Benefit payments is delayed after a technical issue at HMRC.
  - Provisional Met Office data shows that the UK had both its warmest May and warmest spring on record.
  - 2024 general election: Nigel Farage announces that he will run for Parliament at the election, standing as the Reform UK candidate in Clacton. He also resumes leadership of Reform UK, taking over from Richard Tice who becomes the party's chairman.
- 4 June
  - A woman is arrested for throwing a milkshake at Nigel Farage at his election campaign launch in Clacton-on-Sea. A man is also arrested in connection with the incident.
  - Asian hornets are reported to have survived a UK winter for the first time. The invasive species is a potential threat to honey bees and other native pollinators.
  - A cyberattack at several London hospitals forces operations to be cancelled and emergency patients to be diverted elsewhere.
- 5 June
  - The Bank of England issues new Series G II banknotes featuring King Charles III.
  - UK scientists pinpoint a major cause of inflammatory bowel disease that is present in 95% of peoples' DNA.
- 5–6 June – Events take place in the UK and France to mark the 80th anniversary of the Normandy landings. The King pays tribute to veterans in Portsmouth, while the Prime Minister speaks at the British Normandy Memorial in Ver-sur-Mer.
- 6 June
  - Premier League clubs vote by 19–1 in favour of keeping video assistant referee (VAR) technology in games.
  - The number of people becoming ill from a recent outbreak of E. coli across the UK exceeds 100.
- 7 June
  - Rishi Sunak is criticised for leaving the D-day commemorations early to return to the UK to work on the election campaign. He says: "On reflection, it was a mistake not to stay in France longer – and I apologise."
  - Data produced by Zoopla indicates that rents for new properties rose by 6.6% in the year to April 2024, but that this was the slowest rise in two and a half years.
- 9 June – Restrictions on carrying more than 100ml of liquid in hand luggage are temporarily reintroduced at some regional airports in order to "enable further improvements to be made" to new checkpoint systems. Those affected are Newcastle, Leeds Bradford, London City, Aberdeen, Southend and Teesside.
- 10 June – Twenty buildings across the UK are vandalised as part of a co-ordinated attack by Palestine Action, a pro-Palestine group.
- 11 June
  - A High Court judge rules that convicted sex offender Gary Glitter must pay more than £500,000 to a victim he abused when she was 12 years old.
  - A 28-year-old man is arrested on suspicion of public order offences after objects are thrown at Nigel Farage during a campaign tour in Barnsley.
  - Rishi Sunak unveils the Conservative Party's general election manifesto, which includes a further cut in National Insurance, a halving of immigration, and several new housing policies.
  - Former UN secretary general Ban Ki-moon is awarded the inaugural King Charles III Harmony Award during a ceremony held at St James's Palace.
  - Two animal rights protestors vandalise a portrait of Charles III at London's Philip Mould Gallery by covering it with posters.
- 12 June – The ONS reports that the UK economy failed to grow during April. The zero percent growth rate is attributed to unusually high rainfall, well above the long-term average, which impacted consumer spending.
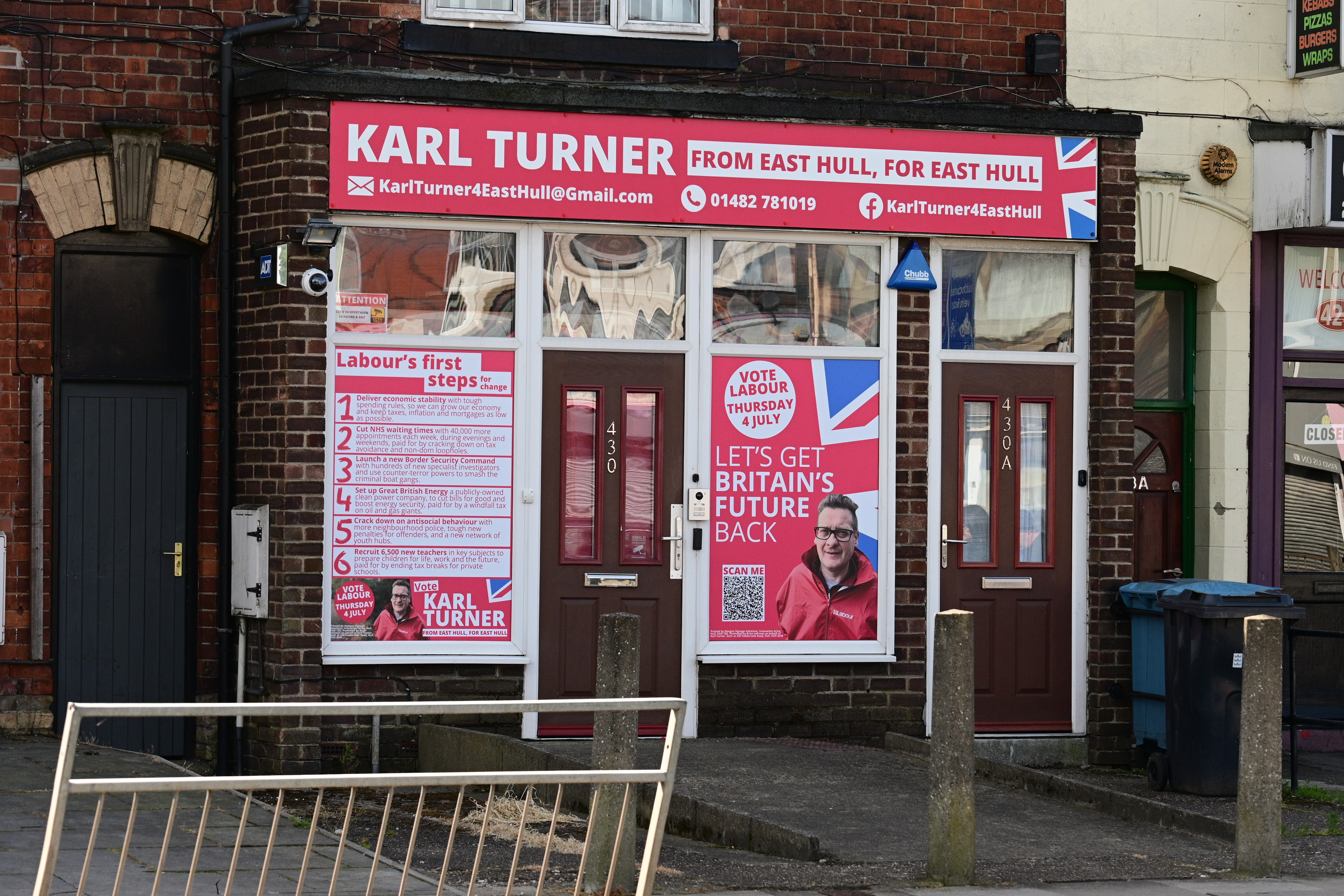
- Labour Party campaigning office in Kingston upon Hull East
  13 June
  - Keir Starmer unveils the Labour Party's general election manifesto. He says that wealth creation is the "number one priority" and that Labour will focus on economic growth.
  - The first commercial-scale liquid air energy storage plant begins development in Carrington, Greater Manchester. Its backers say the £300m facility will create more than 700 jobs and have the capacity to power 480,000 homes.
- 14 June
  - Tesco reports a 5% increase in sales over the past three months, and says that consumer confidence is beginning to return.
  - Manufacturers are recalling several types of prepacked sandwiches, wraps and salads from major supermarkets amid concerns they could be contaminated with E. coli.
  - Nigel Farage says he is "leader of the opposition" after a YouGov poll shows Reform UK ahead of the Conservative Party for the first time. Rishi Sunak responds by saying that Labour would be handed a "blank cheque" if current polling were replicated at the general election.
  - It is confirmed that the Princess of Wales will attend the 2024 Trooping the Colour ceremony, making her first public appearance since her cancer diagnosis.
  - The 2024 Birthday Honours are released, with those recognised including Alan Bates, the postmaster whose campaign brought the Post Office scandal to public attention. There are damehoods for actress Imelda Staunton, fashion designer Anya Hindmarch and artist Tracey Emin, while former Prime Minister Gordon Brown is made a Companion of Honour.
- 15 June – Trooping the Colour, the King's birthday parade, takes place.
- 16 June – Euro 2024: In their first game of the tournament, England win 1–0 against Serbia.
- 17 June
  - The actor Sir Ian McKellen is taken to hospital after falling off stage during a performance of Player Kings at London's Noël Coward Theatre.
  - Data shows that the London Stock Exchange has become the most valuable in Europe for the first time since 2022.
  - The BBC's Panorama documentary series shows recordings of instances of abuse at a school for children with special educational needs in Wallasey, Merseyside.
- 18 June – A review conducted into the first Stephen Lawrence murder investigation concludes that four retired detectives who worked on the case will not face any criminal charges over their actions during the investigation.
- 19 June
  - Figures show inflation fell to the Bank of England's target of 2% in the year to May 2024, down from 2.3% the previous month, and the first time it has been at 2% since July 2021.
  - A woman who accused a therapist of raping and sexually assaulting her at his clinic in London's Belsize Park in 2016 is awarded £200,000 in damages following a civil case she brought against him, after the Crown Prosecution Service did not pursue the case.
  - Figures show that 880 migrants crossed the English Channel on 18 June, setting a new record for daily crossings.
  - Just Stop Oil protesters vandalise Stonehenge by spraying the megaliths with orange cornflour powder paint.
  - A police officer working as part of the prime minister's close protection team is suspended and later arrested as part of an ongoing investigation into bets on the date of the general election.
  - BBC News reports that Laura Saunders, the Conservative candidate for Bristol North West, has become the second Conservative candidate to face an investigation by the Gambling Commission over betting on the date of the general election. It is subsequently reported that her husband, Tony Lee, the Conservative Party's campaigns director, is also being investigated by the commission.
- 20 June
  - The Bank of England holds interest rates at 5.25%, its seventh consecutive freeze.
  - Sunak says he is "incredibly angry" to learn of allegations that members of his party have betted on the date of the election, and that he will "boot out" anyone found to have broken the law.
  - The number of people becoming ill from a recent outbreak of E. coli across the UK reaches 256, which includes 86 hospitalisations. The UK Health Security Agency reports that case numbers have now slowed, and that everything possible is being done to find the root cause, which may be pre-packaged sandwiches containing lettuce.
- 21 June
  - Nigel Farage tells the BBC that he believes the Russo-Ukrainian War to have been precipitated by the West's eastward expansion of NATO and the European Union, but that the war itself is Vladimir Putin's fault.
  - Prakash and Kamal Hinduja, as well as their son Ajay and his wife Namrata, who are members of Britain's richest family, are convicted and sent to prison for exploiting staff brought from India to work in their Geneva villa.
- 22 June
  - Thousands of people join the "Restore Nature Now" march through central London to Parliament Square, demanding action on the UK's declining wildlife.
  - The UK Health Security Agency (UKHSA) and Met Office issue a yellow heat health alert for most of England, to come into force from the morning of Monday 24 June and remain in place until the afternoon of Thursday 27 June.
  - Following criticism from other party leaders over his comments about Putin, Nigel Farage pens an op-ed in The Telegraph in which he says he has never been an "apologist or supporter" of Putin, but that "if you poke the Russian bear with a stick, don't be surprised if he responds".
- 23 June
  - Flights from Manchester Airport's Terminals 1 and 2 are cancelled following a "major" power cut.
  - 2024 United Kingdom general election date betting controversy:
    - The Sunday Times reports that Nick Mason, the Conservative Party's chief data officer, has become the fourth person to face investigation by the Gambling Commission for betting on the date of the election.
    - BBC News reports that the Gambling Commission's investigation involves more people than those already named.
- 24 June
  - Princess Anne is taken to hospital with a head injury thought to have been caused by a horse.
  - The UK records its hottest temperature of 2024 so far, with 28.3 °C recorded at Wisley in Surrey.
  - NHS England confirms that data managed by Synnovis, an organisation that manages blood tests, was stolen in a cyberattack on 3 June.
  - Flights are restored at Manchester Airport, but with delays for passengers scheduled to travel the previous day.
  - Julian Assange leaves the UK after five years held at Belmarsh Prison after reaching a deal with the US to plead guilty to one charge under the Espionage Act instead of the original 18. He will be returned to his native Australia.
- 25 June
  - 2024 United Kingdom general election betting scandal:
    - The Conservative Party withdraws its support for Craig Williams and Laura Saunders as election candidates.
    - Cabinet minister Alister Jack, who previously said he had won £2,100 by betting on the date of the election, then said he was joking, issues a statement in which he says he did not place a bet on the election.
    - The Metropolitan Police confirms that the Gambling Commission are investigating a further five police officers for placing bets on the date of the election.
    - Russell George, the Senedd member for Montgomeryshire, becomes the fifth Conservative politician to be investigated by the Gambling Commission for election betting.
    - Labour suspends Kevin Craig, their candidate for Central Suffolk and North Ipswich, after the Gambling Commission launches an unrelated investigation into him for placing a bet against himself losing in his constituency.
  - Police arrest four men who entered the grounds of Kirby Sigston Manor, the constituency home of Rishi Sunak.
  - The Emperor Naruhito and Empress Masako of Japan begin a three-day state visit to the United Kingdom by meeting the King and Queen Camilla.
- 26 June
  - The media is allowed to report that Constance Marten and Mark Gordon were convicted of concealing the birth of a child and preventing the course of justice after reporting restrictions are lifted. The pair also face a retrial for manslaughter provisionally scheduled to begin in March 2025 and will remain in custody until then.
  - An inquest jury finds that failures "across multiple agencies" contributed to the death of Zara Aleena, who was sexually assaulted and murdered in June 2022 as she walked home from a night out.
  - 2024 United Kingdom general election betting scandal:
    - Alex Cole-Hamilton, leader of the Scottish Liberal Democrats, admits to placing bets on Scottish Liberal Democrat election candidates, but says he did not place bets on the date of the election itself.
    - The Sun reports that Sir Philip Davies, the Conservative candidate for Shipley, allegedly placed an £8,000 bet on whether he would lose his seat at the election, which has a majority of 6,242.
- 27 June
  - The first death from the E. coli outbreak is reported, as the number of confirmed cases reaches 275.
  - The Metropolitan Police says that at least seven police officers are now being investigated for placing bets on the date of the general election.
- 28 June
  - Revised data from the Office for National Statistics shows the UK economy grew by 0.7% in the first three months of 2024 as the UK emerged from a recession; the figures are slightly better than the original forecast.
  - Thousands of customers of high street banks including HSBC, Nationwide, Barclays and Virgin Money are affected by payment problems following issues with a system that operates payments between individuals and firms.
  - Princess Anne returns home from hospital following treatment for a head injury and concussion.
  - Prime Minister Rishi Sunak releases a video condemning Andrew Parker, a Reform UK activist, for using a derogatory slur. Sunak mentions that he was called an "f-ing [fucking] Paki" by Parker, stating that "it was too important not to call out".
  - Spain's Civil Guard confirms they have found the body of a British man from London who went missing while hiking in the Pyrenees on 24 June.
- 29 June – M&S announces plans to launch its own clothing repairs and alterations service starting in August.
- 30 June
  - Spain's Civil Guard says it has called off its search for Jay Slater, who has been missing in Tenerife since 17 June.
  - Euro 2024: England win 2–1 against Slovakia, taking them through to the quarter-finals. After Slovakia had led 1–0 for most of the game, Jude Bellingham scores and equalises in the fifth minute of the six-minute stoppage time, while captain Harry Kane scores the winning goal in the first minute of extra time.

=== July ===
- 1 July
  - Ofgem lowers the energy price cap, saving the average household £122 a year on gas and electric.
  - Passenger and crew of British Airways Flight 149, which was seized by Iraqi authorities when it landed at Kuwait International Airport in August 1990 at the start of the Gulf crisis, are to sue British Airways and the UK government for "deliberately endangering" them after they were held hostage by Iraq.
  - For the second time in three months, military horses break free and run loose through central London.
  - Euro 2024: UEFA investigate Jude Bellingham for a gesture he made following his late equaliser against Slovakia in England's victory in the last-16 tie. Bellingham says it was an inside joke directed at close friends.
- 2 July
  - Three-time tennis champion Andy Murray, 37, withdraws from the Wimbledon singles, following recent surgery on his back. He will attempt to compete in the doubles, which are likely to mark his final appearance in the tournament prior to retiring later in the year.
  - Following her conviction in August 2023, former neonatal nurse Lucy Letby is found guilty in a separate retrial of attempting to murder a premature child, referred to in court as Baby K.
  - St James's University Hospital nursing assistant Mohammad Farooq is convicted at Sheffield Crown Court of crimes relating to plotting lone wolf attacks on RAF Menwith Hill in North Yorkshire and his Leeds workplace.
  - Data obtained by BBC News shows that 1.8 million people owe at least £50,000 in student debt.
- 3 July – Queen Camilla and Prince Edward are formally appointed to the Order of the Thistle at a ceremony in Edinburgh.
- 4 July
  - The 2024 United Kingdom general election is held.
  - Security guard Gavin Plumb is found guilty of plotting to kidnap, rape and murder television presenter Holly Willoughby.

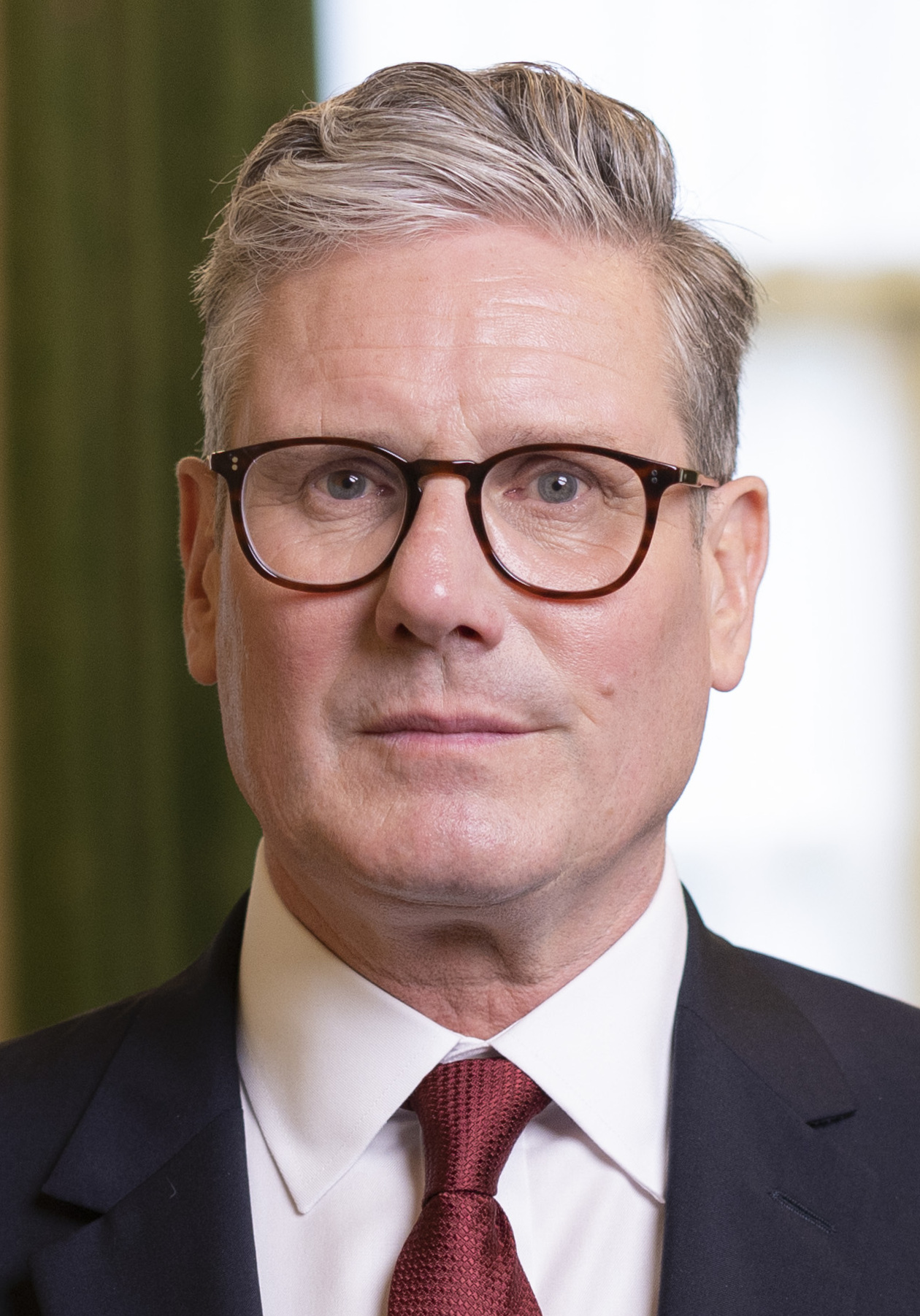
5 July 2024: Sir Keir Starmer becomes the new British prime minister, succeeding Rishi Sunak.

- 5 July
  - Results of the 2024 United Kingdom general election:
    - Sir Keir Starmer becomes the prime minister of the United Kingdom, following a landslide victory for Labour in the general election.
    - The Conservatives are reduced to just 121 seats, the lowest number of MPs in their 190-year history. Among the high-profile losses are former Prime Minister Liz Truss, former cabinet minister Sir Jacob Rees-Mogg, Commons leader Penny Mordaunt, and Defence Secretary Grant Shapps.
    - The Liberal Democrats, led by Sir Ed Davey, achieve their best ever result with 71 seats.
    - The Green Party achieve their best ever result, quadrupling their number of seats to four.
    - Reform UK gain their first seats in Parliament, which includes party leader Nigel Farage taking the constituency of Clacton.
    - The SNP suffers heavy losses, going from 48 seats to just nine.
  - Starmer ministry: Starmer appoints his first cabinet.
    - Angela Rayner becomes Deputy Prime Minister
    - Rachel Reeves becomes Chancellor of the Exchequer
    - David Lammy becomes Foreign Secretary
    - Yvette Cooper becomes Home Secretary
    - John Healey becomes Defence Secretary
- 6 July
  - Starmer holds his first press conference as prime minister, during which he confirms that the Rwanda deportation scheme is "dead and buried".
  - Euro 2024: After finishing 1–1 at the end of extra time, England beat Switzerland 5–3 on penalties, taking them through to the semi-finals.
  - Andy Murray's Wimbledon career comes to an end after Emma Raducanu withdraws from the mixed doubles.
- 7 July
  - Starmer makes his first visit to Scotland as prime minister, for a meeting with First Minister John Swinney.
  - Lewis Hamilton of Mercedes takes his ninth victory at the British Grand Prix, breaking the record for the most wins at a single circuit and Grand Prix, and the most wins at a driver's home Grand Prix, bringing an end to a 56 winless race streak and making him the first driver to win a race after their 300th Grand Prix start.
- 8 July
  - The Chancellor, Rachel Reeves, announces new housebuilding targets for England, and the loosening of planning rules to encourage more new homes.
  - The ban on onshore wind in England is lifted.
- 9 July
  - Minister Jim McMahon tells BBC News that the phrase "levelling-up" will be replaced with "local government" and that his department will now be named the Ministry of Housing, Communities and Local Government.
  - Health Secretary Wes Streeting begins talks aimed at ending a long-running pay dispute with junior doctors in England.
  - Starmer holds his second cabinet meeting, after telling England's regional mayors he will meet with them regularly to help growth across the UK.
  - The first meeting of the 59th Parliament of the United Kingdom takes place.
  - Vacuum manufacturer Dyson announces it is cutting a third of its UK workforce as part of a global restructuring strategy.
- 10 July
  - Starmer travels to Washington, D.C., his first foreign trip as UK Prime Minister, to attend the 75th NATO summit.
  - 2024 Bushey killings: Police announce that a manhunt is underway for Kyle Clifford, a 26-year-old man suspected of murdering three women in Bushey, Hertfordshire, using a crossbow. The public is warned not to approach him. Police identify the three women as 61-year-old Carol Hunt, wife of BBC Racing commentator John Hunt, and two of their daughters, Hannah Hunt, 28 and Louise Hunt, 25. Clifford is found and arrested in Enfield by the early evening.
  - Euro 2024: England win 2–1 against the Netherlands, with Ollie Watkins scoring a 90th minute winning goal, taking them through to the final against Spain.
- 11 July
  - Data shows the UK economy grew by 0.4% in May, expanding more than had been expected.
  - A manhunt is launched after two suitcases containing human remains are found at the Clifton Suspension Bridge in Bristol.
- 12 July
  - Four migrants die and 63 are rescued after their small boat capsizes in an attempt to cross the English Channel. According to International Organization for Migration this brings the total deaths resulting from such crossing attempts to more than 20 so far for 2024.
  - Royal Mail unveil their new logo, based on the Tudor Crown used in the royal cypher of King Charles III, which replaces the St Edward's Crown used by Queen Elizabeth II. The first post box with the new logo is in Cambourne, Cambridgeshire.
  - Following his guilty verdict on 4 July, Gavin Plumb is sentenced to life imprisonment, with a minimum term of 15 years.
  - Police confirm that the remains of two men were found in suitcases at Clifton Suspension Bridge, Bristol, while a separate crime scene is opened in London.
  - Justice Secretary Shabana Mahmood confirms that thousands of prisoners in England and Wales will be released early from their sentences at the beginning of September, warning of the "total collapse" of the prison system and a "total breakdown of law and order" without steps being taken to ease prison overcrowding.
  - NHS England announces that patients with multiple sclerosis in England, Wales and Northern Ireland will be offered injections of ocrelizumab, which can slow the progress of the disease.
  - Princess Anne returns to public duties following treatment for a head injury.
- 13 July
  - A 34-year-old man is arrested at Bristol's Temple Meads railway station on suspicion of murder following the discovery of human remains in two suitcases at Clifton Suspension Bridge.
  - Energy Secretary Ed Miliband approves the Gate Burton, Sunnica, and Mallard Pass solar farms, totalling 1.3 gigawatts of new capacity, as Labour announces a "rooftop revolution" to boost home installations of solar power.
  - Researchers have discovered the great silver water beetle in the UK for the first time in 86 years after one was found at the Great Fen in Cambridgeshire.
  - 2024 Wimbledon Championships:
    - Barbora Krejcikova wins the Women's singles final.
    - Great Britain's Henry Patten and Finland's Harri Heliovaara win the Men's doubles.
    - Buckingham Palace confirms that the Princess of Wales will attend the Men's singles final.
- 14 July
  - Prime Minister Keir Starmer condemns the attempted assassination of Donald Trump at a rally in Pennsylvania, saying: "I am appalled by the shocking scenes at President Trump's rally and we send him and his family our best wishes. Political violence in any form has no place in our societies and my thoughts are with all the victims of this attack."
  - 2024 Wimbledon Championships: Carlos Alcaraz wins the Men's singles final, defeating Novak Djokovic for the second consecutive year.
  - The Met Office issues a yellow weather warning for heavy rain for parts of England and Wales for the following day.
  - Euro 2024: England are beaten 2–1 against Spain in the final of the tournament. A peak TV audience of 23.8 million across the BBC and ITV is reported, the highest combined audience for any TV event broadcast this year so far.
  - Buckingham Palace announces that King Charles III and Queen Camilla will visit Australia and Samoa in October.
- 15 July
  - Disappearance of Jay Slater: Spanish police announce that search teams looking for Jay Slater in Tenerife have found a body.
  - A 34-year-old man appears in court and is remanded in custody charged with the murders of Albert Alfonso and Paul Longworth, whose remains were found in suitcases at the Clifton Suspension Bridge.
  - A new search begins for the body of Muriel McKay, who was kidnapped in December 1969 and held for ransom, then later killed.
  - Figures show that 427 migrants crossed the English Channel in small boats, the highest daily number since Keir Starmer became the prime minister.
- 16 July
  - Officials in Spain confirm that the body found in Tenerife the previous day is that of missing British teenager Jay Slater.
  - Vaughan Gething resigns as First Minister of Wales after cabinet members Mick Antoniw, Lesley Griffiths, Julie James and Jeremy Miles resign from the Welsh Government and call on him to quit.
  - Gareth Southgate resigns as England manager following the team's defeat in the Euro 2024 final.
- 17 July
  - Office for National Statistics data shows that inflation remained at the Bank of England's target of 2% in June 2024.
  - 2024 State Opening of Parliament: Labour sets out its legislative programme for its first parliamentary session in the King's Speech. Proposals include bills to renationalise the railways, to strengthen the rights of workers, tackle illegal immigration, reform the House of Lords, and undertake a programme to speed up the delivery of "high quality infrastructure" and housing.
  - The UK becomes the first country in Europe to allow the sale of lab-grown meat, following the approval of a pet food made of cell-cultivated chicken.
- 18 July
  - The first report into the COVID-19 pandemic identifies significant flaws in the UK's pandemic planning strategy which led to a higher number of deaths and a greater economic cost. The report says that preparations were made for a mild pandemic, which led to the use of untested lockdowns. Groupthink among scientists and the government's failure to challenge their own plans is also blamed.
  - Five members of Just Stop Oil who organised protests that brought the M25 to a standstill over four days are sentenced to prison terms at Southwark Crown Court.
  - Public disorder breaks out in the Harehills area of Leeds, resulting in a bus being set on fire and damage to a police car.
- 19 July
  - Global IT outages: A major, worldwide IT outage caused by a faulty CrowdStrike update results in severe disruption to many sectors, including banking, healthcare, retail, telecommunications, and travel.
  - The hottest day of the year so far is recorded, with St James's Park in London reaching 31.9 °C, exceeding the previous high of 30.5 °C in Surrey on 26 June.
  - Ukrainian president Volodymyr Zelenskyy visits Downing Street and addresses the cabinet, becoming the first foreign leader to address a British cabinet since 1997, and urges Keir Starmer to "show your leadership" by helping to remove restrictions on the use of weapons supplied to Ukraine.
  - Office for National Statistics data shows that UK national debt is at its highest since 1962, with government debt worth 99.5% of the value of the economy in June, exceeding levels reached during the COVID-19 pandemic.
  - Unexpected mid-contract price rises from companies such as mobile phone, broadband and pay-TV providers are banned, with new rules coming in from 17 January 2025.
- 20 July
  - Global IT outages: NHS England says that digital systems for GPs surgeries and pharmacies have been mostly restored, but warns there could be some disruption for the next few days as surgeries work through a backlog of appointments.
  - July–September 2024 Welsh Labour leadership election: Welsh Labour officials agree a timeline for the election, with a new leader to be in place on 14 September.
  - Figures produced by the Institute for Fiscal Studies suggest the UK government would need to spend an extra £3bn to implement a 5.5% pay rise for teaching and NHS staff.
- 21 July
  - It is confirmed that the bodies of Briton Sarah Packwood and her Canadian husband Brett Clibbery, who disappeared on 18 June while sailing their eco-friendly yacht across the Atlantic Ocean, were found on Sable Island near Nova Scotia on 12 July.
  - Six people are killed in a crash between a car and a motorbike on the A61 road near Barnsley.
- 22 July – BT is fined £17.5m for a "catastrophic failure" of its emergency call handling service which led to thousands of 999 calls not being connected.
- 23 July
  - Following a trial at Woolwich Crown Court, radical preacher Anjem Choudhary is convicted of directing the banned Islamist organisation Al-Muhajiroun.
  - The Home Office confirms that the contract for the Bibby Stockholm, the vessel used to house asylum seekers, will not be renewed after January 2025.
  - A report from the National Audit Office warns that the UK government may be forced to discourage people from travelling by train between Birmingham and Manchester after the Birmingham–Manchester leg of HS2 was scrapped. This is because HS2 trains will still continue on to Manchester, but will have fewer seats than the present rolling stock.
  - Seven Labour MPs, including former shadow chancellor John McDonnell and former shadow minister Rebecca Long-Bailey, have the Labour whip suspended for six months after voting against the government and in favour of an SNP amendment to scrap the two-child benefit cap. McDonnell said, "I'm following Keir Starmer's example as he said put country before party".
  - Dressage rider Charlotte Dujardin withdraws from the 2024 Summer Olympics after a video emerged online of her excessively whipping a horse. Dujardin describes her actions as an "error of judgement."
- 24 July
  - July 2024 Welsh Labour leadership election: Eluned Morgan is elected unopposed as the new leader of Welsh Labour after nominations close at midday.
  - A policeman is filmed kicking and stamping on the head of a man at Manchester Airport. The officer concerned is subsequently suspended from the force pending an investigation.
- 26 July
  - France railway arson attack: A series of attacks are staged on the infrastructure of the TGV rail network, resulting in damage and cancellations. Eurostar trains linking the UK and France are also affected by this.
  - The UK confirms it will retract a previous objection to ICC arrest warrants against Israeli Prime Minister Benjamin Netanyahu and Defense Minister Yoav Gallant.
  - The Independent Office for Police Conduct confirms a police officer will face a criminal investigation over an incident where a man was kicked and stamped on at Manchester Airport.
  - Alternative therapist Hongchi Xiao is found guilty of gross negligence manslaughter after a woman died in 2016 after attending one of his "slap therapy" workshops.
- 27 July
  - 2024 Summer Olympics: Yasmin Harper and Scarlett Mew Jensen win the first medal for Team GB, with a diving bronze in the women's synchronised 3m springboard final.
  - Cineworld announces the closure of six of its UK outlets under restructuring plans.
  - New video emerges of the moments leading up to the incident at Manchester Airport where a man was kicked and stamped on by a police officer. This appears to show police attempting to restrain one man, before a second man tries to intervene and a fight breaks out.
- 28 July – 2024 Summer Olympics: Adam Peaty wins a silver medal in the men's breaststroke 100m final, narrowly missing out on gold by 0.02 seconds.
- 29 July
  - 2024 Southport stabbing: Three girls are killed and ten others, eight children and two adults, are injured in a mass stabbing at a Taylor Swift-themed dance and yoga event in Southport, Merseyside. Two of the girls are killed at the scene, and the third dies from her injuries the following day. Five of the eight injured children are said to be in a critical condition, while the two adults are also critically injured. A major incident is declared, as armed police arrest a 17-year-old male and seize a knife.
  - The UK government and the British Medical Association (BMA) reach agreement on an improved pay deal for junior doctors in England worth 22% on average over two years, which the BMA will put to its members.
  - Chancellor Rachel Reeves conducts a spending review in which she limits winter fuel payments to pensioners receiving pension credit (affecting around 10 million people), and announces the cancellation of several infrastructure projects. Reeves argues she has had to make "necessary and urgent decisions" because of an "unfunded" and "undisclosed" overspending of £21.9bn by the previous government. The shadow chancellor, Jeremy Hunt, disagrees with Reeves, saying that when his party was in power there were no hidden overspends and that the government had been open about public finances. Hunt says Reeves misled the country knowing "taxes will have to go up, and she chose not to tell us". He predicts that her first Budget will be the "biggest betrayal in history by a new chancellor".
  - The new Labour government scraps the controversial proposed Stonehenge road tunnel.
  - 2024 Summer Olympics: The first gold medal for Team GB is won by Laura Collett in the final round of show jumping. Tom Pidcock wins a second in mountain biking later in the day.
  - A judge issues an arrest warrant for Tommy Robinson after he left the UK via Eurotunnel on the eve of a major court case against him.
  - Former BBC newsreader Huw Edwards is charged with making indecent images of children.
  - The High Court rules that the previous government's use of emergency legislation to ban puberty blockers is lawful.
- 30 July
  - 2024 Southport stabbing:
    - The three young girls killed in the attack are named as Bebe King, aged 6; Elsie Dot Stancombe, aged 7; and Alice Dasilva Aguiar, aged 9.
    - American singer Taylor Swift reacts to the attack which took place at an event themed around her music, speaking of her "complete shock" in a statement on Instagram.
    - Prime Minister Keir Starmer and Home Secretary Yvette Cooper visit the scene to pay respects to the victims and meet with emergency workers who responded to the incident.
    - Police issue a warning after misinformation over the identity of the perpetrator spreads online and is reposted by high-profile figures such as Andrew Tate and Laurence Fox.
    - A vigil is held outside the Atkinson in the town's Eastbank Square in the evening, with thousands of people in attendance.
    - Riots break out later in the evening as far-right protestors gather outside Southport Mosque, before attacking police officers, throwing objects at the mosque, and setting a police vehicle alight. Over fifty police officers are injured, 27 of those are hospitalised, and three police dogs are injured. The violence is widely condemned, including by the mother of one of the victims.
  - An arrest warrant is issued for Katie Price after she fails to attend a court hearing relating to her bankruptcies.
  - Islamic extremist preacher Anjem Choudary is sentenced to life imprisonment, with a minimum term of 28 years, after being found guilty of directing the banned terror group al-Muhajiroun and encouraging support for it through online meetings.
  - The UK experiences its hottest day of the year so far, with temperatures hitting 32 °C.
  - Housing Secretary Angela Rayner reintroduces mandatory local housing targets in an overhaul of planning rules; the new Labour government has pledged to build 1.5 million new homes by 2029.
  - 2024 Summer Olympics: Nathan Hales wins a third gold medal for Team GB in shooting, while in swimming, the men's 4 × 200 m freestyle relay team win a fourth.
- 31 July
  - Huw Edwards appears at Westminster Magistrates' Court and pleads guilty to three counts of making indecent images of children. He will be sentenced on 16 September.
  - Tulip Siddiq, Economic Secretary to the Treasury and Labour MP for Hampstead and Highgate, becomes the first MP of the new Parliament to be placed under investigation by the Standards Commissioner, over a failure to register rental income on a London property.
  - 2024 Southport stabbing
    - Far-right protesters clash with police outside Downing Street, as violent disorder following the stabbings spills over into a second day. More than 100 people are arrested.
    - The unrest also spreads to Hartlepool, which sees a police car torched and several officers injured.
    - Further pockets of disorder break out in Manchester and Aldershot, where demonstrators gather outside hotels housing migrants.

=== August ===
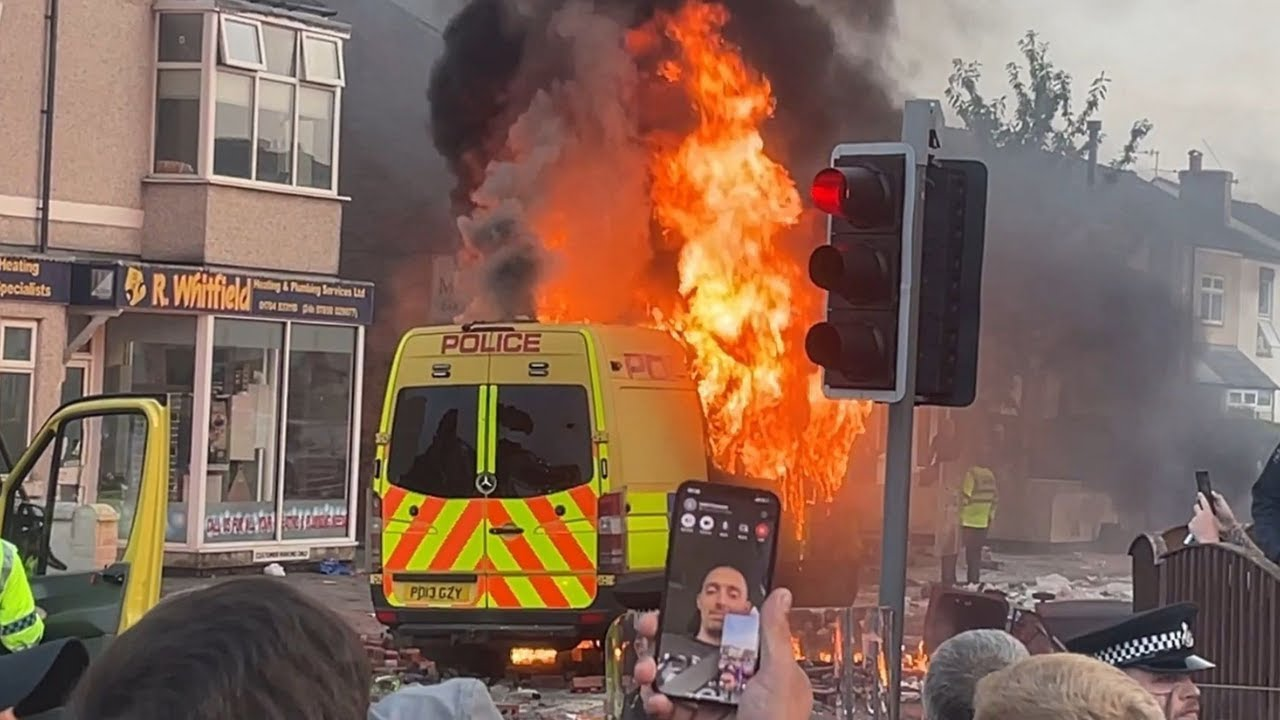
August 2024: The worst riots since 2011 occur in various parts of England, and in Northern Ireland, triggered by a mass stabbing of children in Southport.

- 1 August
  - 2024 Southport stabbing
    - The 17-year-old suspect is named as Axel Rudakubana. He is charged with three counts of murder, ten counts of attempted murder, and one count of possession of a bladed article. As a minor, he could not initially be named; but reporting restrictions on his identity are lifted by Liverpool Crown Court. After being charged, Rudakubana is remanded in custody until a plea hearing on 25 October.
    - Keir Starmer holds a crisis meeting with police chiefs and an emergency press conference in the wake of rioting following the murders. Starmer condemns "far-right hatred" responsible for the unrest, and announces the launch of a national violent disorder programme that will see greater cooperation between police forces to tackle violent disorder, as fears grow of a "summer of unrest" fuelled by misinformation.
  - The Bank of England cuts the UK interest rate from 5.25% to 5%, the first interest rate cut since the start of the COVID-19 pandemic in March 2020.
  - GPs in England vote to take industrial action by working-to-rule over a lack of funding and a decline in care, which could see GP appointments capped at 25 per day.
- 2 August
  - The BBC reports that Labour has shelved £1.3bn of funding promised by the Conservatives for technology and artificial intelligence (AI) projects, including an exascale supercomputer at Edinburgh University.
  - 2024 Summer Olympics: Team GB secures three gold medals – in rowing, equestrian, and trampoline – bringing their current total to 25 medals: nine golds, eight silvers and eight bronzes.
  - BBC News reports that Paul Powlesland has become the first juror to swear an oath on a river after doing so at Snaresbrook Crown Court.
  - New powers under the Victims and Prisoners Act come into force that prevent prisoners convicted of the most serious offences in England and Wales from marrying while in custody. One of the first uses of the new legislation is to prevent convicted murderer Levi Bellfield from entering into a civil partnership with his girlfriend.
  - Details are published of the autumn programme of COVID-19 vaccination, which will be broadly the same as 2023 with the vaccine offered to all adults aged 65 and over, as well as certain health and social care staff, older care home residents and people in clinical risk groups.
  - 2024 riots: Rioting breaks out in Sunderland, where protestors clash with police outside a mosque.
- 3 August – The BBC removes a video promoting Children in Need 2018 from its website after it emerges the video features the suspect in the 2024 Southport stabbing.
- 4 August – Starmer condemns the ongoing "far-right thuggery" around the UK and says those involved "will regret it", as the number of people arrested in relation to the disorder exceeds 140. At least 10 police officers are injured at the Holiday Inn Express Hotel in Rotherham, with one left unconscious after a head injury, while others have broken bones.
- 5 August
  - 2024 United Kingdom riots:
    - Starmer holds an emergency COBRA meeting of ministers, civil servants, the police and intelligence officers in response to the rioting of recent days.
    - Starmer announces the establishment of a "standing army" of specialist police officers to address the violence, and help bring it to an end.
  - The FTSE 100 falls by more than 2%, its biggest drop since January, amid a global market selloff triggered by weaker-than-expected economic data from the US.
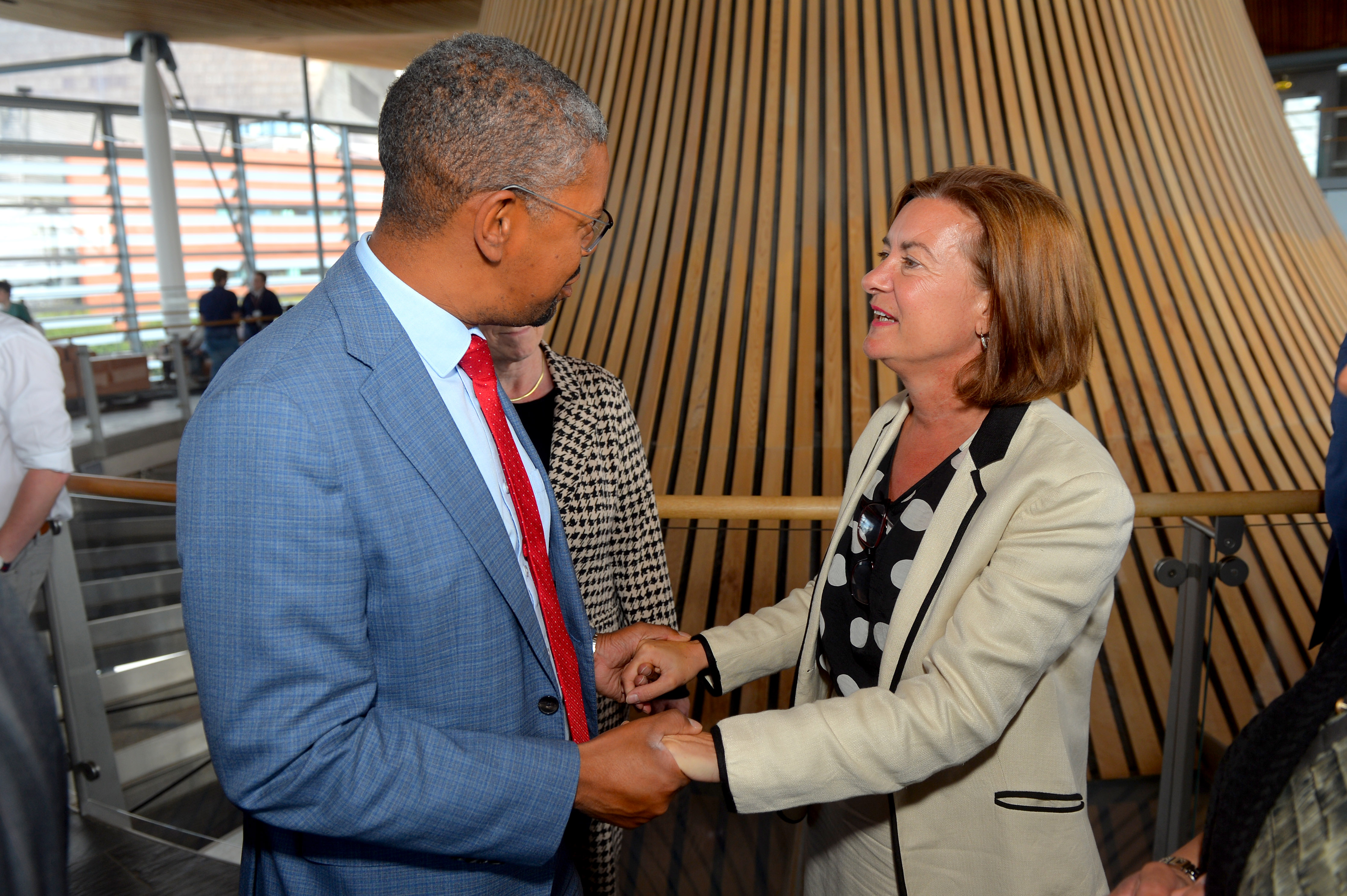
- Eluned Morgan, the new Welsh First Minister with her predecessor, Vaughan Gething, who was appointed earlier in the year.
  6 August
  - 2024 United Kingdom riots: As the rioting enters its seventh day, the number of people arrested in relation to the disorder exceeds 400. The government announces an extra 567 prison places, while police chiefs announce an extra 2,200 riot trained officers will be deployed.
  - Alder Hey Children's Hospital confirms that all the children treated as a result of the Southport stabbing have been discharged.
  - The Senedd is recalled to elect a new First Minister of Wales, with Eluned Morgan nominated as the first woman to hold the post.
  - Thames Water, Yorkshire Water and Northumbrian Water face fines of £168m fines by Ofwat over historic sewage spills.
- 7 August
  - The Supreme Court rules that Shamima Begum will not be allowed to challenge the removal of her British citizenship.
  - 2024 United Kingdom riots:
    - UK police announce their largest mobilisation since the 2011 England riots, due to the threat of further violence targeting asylum seekers and immigrants, with 6,000 riot police on duty throughout the country and 2,000 in reserve as reinforcements.
    - The first sentences for crimes committed during the riots are handed out to three men who took part in unrest in Southport and Liverpool. The three are sentenced to periods of between 20 months and three years in prison.
- 8 August
  - 2024 United Kingdom riots: A further 21 people receive prison sentences for their roles in the riots.
  - The Independent Office for Police Conduct confirms that a second officer is under investigation over an incident at Manchester Airport where a man was kicked.
  - Katie Price is arrested at Heathrow Airport for failing to attend court and is taken into police custody.
- 9 August
  - Huw Edwards is asked by the BBC to pay back more than £200,000 that he received from the corporation after being arrested on child abuse image charges.
  - Figures show the number of overseas workers and students and their families applying for visas has fallen by a third in the past 12 months following rule changes that prevented many workers from bringing their families with them.
- 11 August
  - 2024 Summer Olympics: Team GB have secured 65 medals at the 2024 Olympic Games, equalling the number of medals won in 2012.
  - With the following day expected to be the hottest of the year as a result of a "heat spike", the Met Office issues two yellow weather warnings for thunderstorms for Northern Ireland, northern England and Scotland.
  - Figures show that 703 migrants crossed the English Channel in small boats, the highest daily number since Keir Starmer became the prime minister.
- 12 August
  - The hottest day of the year so far is confirmed by the Met Office, with a high of 34.8 °C recorded in Cambridge.
  - Five-time Olympic medallist Tom Daley announces his retirement from diving at the age of 30.
  - 2024 United Kingdom riots: Two 12-year-old boys become the youngest people to be convicted following their involvement in the disorder.
  - Figures show that 125 migrants crossed the English Channel in small boats.
- 13 August
  - Banknotes featuring King Charles, with a face value of £78,430 and low serial numbers, are auctioned for £914,127 to raise money for charity.
  - An inquest is held into the death of former England cricketer Graham Thorpe, who died from suicide after being struck by a train at a railway station.
  - Data from the Office for National Statistics shows UK unemployment fell to 4.2% in the three months to June, down from 4.4% during the previous quarter.
  - Ofgem approves a £3.4bn project for a subsea cable allowing renewable energy to be transported from Scotland to England more easily.
- 14 August
  - Inflation is reported to have risen from 2% to 2.2%, the first increase during 2024. The predicted increase is largely a result of a smaller fall in gas and electricity prices in July when compared to July 2023.
  - 2024 United Kingdom riots: A 53-year-old woman from Cheshire is sentenced to 15 months in prison after admitting sending a communication threatening death or serious harm over a Facebook post in which she suggested a mosque should "be blown up with the adults inside".
  - Two men found in a burned-out car in Malmö, Sweden, are confirmed as two British men, Farooq Abdulrazak, 37, and Juan Cifuentes, 33, who went missing in July.
  - Train drivers' union ASLEF is to ballot its members on a revised pay offer following negotiations with the Department for Transport.
  - Data released by the British Transport Police Authority shows a 20% increase in violent crimes against women and girls on the public transport network when compared to 2023.
  - Figures show that 107 migrants crossed the English Channel in small boats.
- 15 August
  - Office for National Statistics figures show the UK economy grew by 0.6% in the three months up to July, faster than any of the G7 group of advanced economies over the past six months.
  - As many as 74,000 convictions for train fare evasion may have to be quashed following a landmark ruling by Judge Goldspring, the UK's chief magistrate, on six test cases. The cases involve use of the single justice procedure, whereby cases are heard behind closed doors, which Goldspring ruled void as the process should not have been used.
  - A Level results are published in England, Wales and Northern Ireland, and show the first overall increase in top grades since 2021, with 27.8% of all grades rated A* or A, increasing from 27.2% in 2023.
  - 2024 United Kingdom riots: A 15-year-old boy from Sunderland becomes the first person in England to be charged with rioting, an offence that carries a maximum of 10 years in prison.
  - A shipwreck, believed to be that of HMS Hawke, which was sunk by a torpedo during World War I, has been found off the Aberdeenshire coast.
- 16 August
  - The UK government confirms that victims of the infected blood scandal will receive financial support for life, with additional payments for those who were subjected to "unethical research".
  - Retailers report a 0.5% increase in sales during July, fuelled largely by Euro 2024 and summer discounts.
  - 2024 United Kingdom riots: Two men who the prosecution said were part of a "baying mob" that attacked a car containing three Romanian men in Hull on 3 August are sentenced to prison terms of six years and four years eight months respectively.
- 17 August
  - A large fire at Somerset House in central London is tackled by 125 firefighters.
  - Figures show that 492 migrants crossed the English Channel in small boats, the second highest daily number since Keir Starmer became the prime minister.
- 18 August
  - The Home Office announces that new plans by the UK government will see extreme misogyny treated as a form of extremism.
  - The Courtauld Gallery at Somerset House reopens to the public following the previous day's fire, but the rest of the building remains closed.
  - It is announced that the UK's 31 remaining Ted Baker stores will close on or by 20 August, with 500 jobs at risk.
- 19 August
  - British tech tycoon Mike Lynch and his 18-year-old daughter are reported missing, along with several other people, after a yacht sinks off the coast of Sicily. Their bodies are recovered by divers over the next few days.
  - Professor Chris Whitty, the UK's chief medical officer, meets with government ministers to discuss the UK's preparedness to respond to mpox. This follows the recent declaration of a public health emergency of international concern by the WHO.
  - A rocket being developed by Rocket Factory Augsburg, a German company hoping to launch the UK's first space flight, explodes during a launch test at the Shetland Space Centre.
- 20 August
  - King Charles travels to Southport to meet victims of the Southport attack.
  - The first £1 coins to feature the image of Charles III enter circulation.
  - The European Union confirms plans to introduce its €7 EU visa waiver for British holidaymakers in the first half of 2025.
- 21 August – A 39-year-old man is arrested on suspicion of murder, following the deaths of a mother and three children in a house fire in Bradford.
- 22 August
  - The 2024 GCSE results are published in England, Wales and Northern Ireland, showing a fall in the overall pass rate for the third year running, with 67.6% of entries graded at least 4/C, compared with 68.2% in 2023. There is also a widening gap between results in London and the rest of England.
  - The National Institute for Health and Care Excellence (NICE) confirms that Lecanemab, the first drug developed that slows the early stages of Alzheimer's disease, will not be made available on the NHS in England because its benefits "are too small to justify the costs".
- 23 August
  - BNT116, the world's first mRNA lung cancer vaccine, begins a Phase I clinical trial in seven countries including the UK.
  - The UK government authorises the Infected Blood Compensation Authority to begin making payments to affected patients under The Infected Blood Compensation Scheme Regulations 2024.
  - The body of 18-year-old Hannah Lynch, daughter of Mike Lynch, is recovered from the Bayesian, making her the seventh and final victim of the sinking.
  - Storm Lilian brings disruption to much of the UK, with gusts of up to 70 mph in some regions.
  - The Energy Price Cap is set to rise by 10% in October, with the average household price for gas and electricity increasing by £149 per year.
  - A report by the United Nations urges the UK to take measures to curb race hate speech, including by politicians.
- 24–26 August – Eight people are stabbed during the Notting Hill Carnival, with a total of 334 people being arrested during the event.
- 24 August
  - Data from the Office for National Statistics shows the number of those aged 16–24 not in employment, education or training rose to 872,000 during the period of April to June 2024.
  - British athletes Helene Raynsford and Gregor Ewan light the Paralympic Flame at Stoke Mandeville, ahead of its journey to Paris for the 2024 Summer Paralympics.
- 25 August
  - EE, one of the UK's largest mobile phone networks, advises parents not to give primary school age children smartphones after receiving an increase in the number of requests for guidance from parents.
  - A British Reuters employee named as Ryan Evans is confirmed as having been killed in a missile attack on a hotel in Ukraine the previous day.
- 26 August
  - A major incident is declared as a fire engulfs a block of flats in Dagenham, east London, which had "known" safety issues. More than 100 people are evacuated, with two taken to hospital.
  - The death is announced of former England manager Sven-Göran Eriksson, aged 76.
- 27 August
  - Oasis announce a reunion tour planned for 2025, the first time the Gallagher brothers have played together since 2009.
  - Sir Keir Starmer delivers his first major speech since becoming prime minister, outlining the government's plans and priorities moving into the autumn. He warns of "cracks in our society" after the riots earlier in the month.
  - A 0.3% fall in shop prices is recorded, the first in three years, and largely fuelled by lower clothing and furniture prices.
- 28 August – Starmer meets with German Chancellor Olaf Scholz in Berlin to discuss UK–EU relations.
- 29 August
  - Suicides in England and Wales reach their highest level since 1999, with rates increasing across all age groups.
  - Starmer confirms that the UK government is considering introducing bans on outdoor smoking in order to reduce the burden on the NHS.
  - A series of planned ASLEF strikes by drivers at London North Eastern Railway are called off following last-minute talks between union and company officials.
- 30 August
  - The UK government announces that badger culling in England as a means to fight the spread of bovine tuberculosis will end in the next five years, with separate vaccines for badgers and cattle being developed instead.
  - Figures released by the Ministry of Justice show a record high in the number of people in prison in England and Wales, with 88,350 people in prison custody. The rise has been exacerbated by the number of people sent to prison for their participation in the 2024 United Kingdom riots and the August Bank Holiday weekend, during which prisoners are not traditionally released. At one point during the preceding week, the number of spare prison places is believed to have fallen to less than 100.
- 31 August – A yellow weather warning for heavy rain and thunderstorms is issued for the following day for much of England and parts of east Wales.

=== September ===
- 2 September
  - The UK government suspends the sale of some UK arms to Israel, citing a "clear risk" they may be used to commit serious violations of international law.
  - One word Ofsted assessments for schools in England are scrapped with immediate effect, and following the January 2023 death of Ruth Perry, a headteacher who committed suicide after her school received a poor Ofsted grading.
  - The Household Support Fund, used to help people with cost-of-living payments, is extended by the UK government.
  - A winter vaccination programme to protect newborn babies and older people against respiratory syncytial virus (RSV) is launched in England, Wales and Northern Ireland.
  - British endurance swimmer Sam Farrow is believed to have set a new world record after swimming the length of Lake Geneva in 22 hours and 48 minutes.
  - The UK has experienced its coolest summer since 2015, Met Office data has confirmed.
- 3 September
  - Gaza war: The UK suspends 30 out of 350 arms export licences to Israel.
  - The UK government awards nine offshore wind farm contracts totalling 4.9 gigawatts (GW), as part of the drive towards achieving 60GW by 2030.
  - Six children and six adults die attempting to cross the Channel from France to England.
- 4 September
  - Publication of the report into the Grenfell tower fire, which blames "dishonest" companies and a string of failures by successive governments.
  - The extradition hearing of Kimberlee Singler, a US woman accused of killing two of her children in Colorado in December 2023, begins in London.
  - A military helicopter ditches in the English Channel near Dorset, killing a member of the Royal Navy. The serviceman is subsequently named as Lt Rhodri Leyshon.
- 5 September
  - The Competition and Markets Authority (CMA) launches an investigation into the sale of Oasis tickets, following the band's announcement on 27 August and the use of "dynamic pricing".
  - The UK government sets out its plan to abolish hereditary peers in the House of Lords.
- 6 September
  - 2024 United Kingdom riots: Thomas Birley, 27, is sentenced to nine years in prison for what a judge calls "grotesque" violence at a riot in Rotherham – the longest prison sentence any of those involved has received so far.
  - Russian invasion of Ukraine: A new £162 million package of support for Ukraine is announced by UK Defence Secretary John Healey, which includes an additional 650 short-range missiles.
  - Figures released by the Ministry of Justice indicate the prison population of England and Wales has reached a new high of 88,521.
  - 2024 Summer Paralympics: ParalympicsGB win their 100th medal of the Paris Games, including their 42nd gold, surpassing the 41 golds won at Tokyo 2020.
- 7 September – The Body Shop is acquired by a consortium led by British cosmetics tycoon Mike Jatania, securing its remaining 113 stores, as well as the positions of its 1,300 shop and office staff.
- 8 September
  - Great Ormond Street Hospital has launched an urgent review of the cases of more than 700 patients after concerns were raised about one of its former surgeons. The review has so far identified 22 children who came to harm as a result of actions performed by the surgeon.
  - 2024 Summer Paralympics: ParalympicsGB finish the tournament with 124 medals, including 49 golds, achieving second place in the medal table, and having won medals in all but one Paralympic sport.
- 9 September
  - The third stage of the UK COVID-19 Inquiry opens, and begins by looking at healthcare. The hearing is told the NHS was "creaking at the seams" at the start of the pandemic and this undermined the quality of healthcare that was given.
  - Kensington Palace releases a video in which Catherine, Princess of Wales confirms she has finished her chemotherapy treatment.
- 10 September
  - The UK joins France, Germany and the United States in placing fresh sanctions on Iran for supplying Russia with ballistic missiles used against Ukraine, including restricting Iran Air flights to Europe and the US and freezing the assets of key Russian supporters in Iran.
  - The emergency early release of some prisoners to alleviate overcrowding in prisons in England and Wales begins, but Victims' Commissioner Baroness Helen Newlove warns that not all victims of crime were informed of their offenders' early release.
  - Earnings increased by 4% in the three months to July, meaning state pensions for 2025–26 are likely to rise by £460 per year under the triple lock formula.
  - MPs vote 348–228 to restrict winter fuel payments to pensioners receiving Pension Credit.
- 11 September
  - Data from the Office for National Statistics indicates there was no economic growth in July, the second consecutive month during which the economy did not expand.
  - The 1991 conviction of Oliver Campbell, a man with learning disabilities who was sentenced to life imprisonment for the murder of Baldev Hoondle a year earlier, is overturned after the Court of Appeal declares it to have been "unsafe".
  - 2024 United Kingdom riots: A mother who went on holiday to Ibiza rather than attend her 12-year-old son's sentencing for his role in the riots is ordered to pay £1,200 in compensation and attend a six-month parenting course.
- 12 September
  - Starmer says he will draw up a 10-year plan that will see the "biggest reimagining of the NHS" since it was formed after a report by Lord Darzi describes the health service as being in a "critical condition", but the prime minister says there will be no extra funding for the NHs without reform.
  - Starmer confirms the UK government did not carry out an assessment of the potential impact of cutting winter fuel payments to pensioners before making the announcement.
  - A nonbinding people's jury on assisted dying, established by the Nuffield Council on Bioethics, recommends the law in England should be changed to allow terminally ill patients to make the decision to end their own lives if they wish to do so.
  - The UK government confirms that a ban on junk food advertising on British television before 9.00pm is scheduled to come into force on 1 October 2025.
  - The Royal Navy confirms it has made its first-ever seizure of a "narco-sub", a semi-submersible or fully-submersible vessel used by drugs smugglers, with the operation to seize the craft taking place in the Caribbean on Monday 9 September.
- 13 September
  - The High Court rules against Woodhouse Colliery, a plan for the UK's first deep coal mine since 1986. Justice Holgate finds that Michael Gove acted unlawfully in accepting West Cumbria Mining's claim that the mine would be net zero, because this relied on offsetting through carbon credits purchased from abroad.
  - Russia revokes the accreditation of six British diplomats it accuses of spying. The UK Foreign Office dismisses the allegations of spying as "completely baseless". President Vladimir Putin also warns the West against allowing Ukraine to use long-range weapons to target Russia.
  - British citizen Youssouf Ezangi is reported to be among 37 people sentenced to death by a military court in the Democratic Republic of the Congo for their part in an attempted coup d'état earlier in the year.
  - Data released by the Ministry of Justice shows a fall in the prison population of 2,188 compared to 6 September, with the number of prisoners in England and Wales standing at 86,333. The fall is largely due to the early release of some offenders to deal with a shortage of prison places.
  - The Office for National Statistics confirms that the number of transgender people living in the United Kingdom may have been overestimated in the 2021 census.
- 14 September – UEFA warns the UK government that Britain could be prevented from hosting Euro 2028 over plans for a football regulator (outlined in the Football Governance Bill) because of concerns about "government interference" in the sport.
- 15 September – Columnists Jonathan Freedland, Hadley Freeman and David Aaronovitch resign from The Jewish Chronicle over a row concerning allegedly fabricated stories about Israeli military operations in Gaza.
- 16 September
  - Huw Edwards, formerly the BBC's most senior news presenter, is given a six-month suspended jail sentence for child abuse image offences. He is placed on the sex offenders' register for seven years and is required to complete a rehabilitation programme.
  - Junior doctors in England accept the government's offer of a 22% pay rise over two years, ending their long-running dispute.
  - A study by Aston University Business School highlights the impact of Brexit red tape on trade between the UK and EU, which the study argues is getting worse.
- 17 September
  - Glasgow is formally selected as the host city of the Commonwealth Games in 2026.
  - A 12-year-old boy becomes the youngest person to be sentenced over the 2024 United Kingdom riots after receiving a 12-month referral at Liverpool Youth Court.
  - A study suggests that UK goods exports to the EU were down 27% between 2021 and 2023, while imported goods were 32% lower over the same period than where they would have been had Brexit not happened.
- 18 September
  - Train drivers accept a pay deal of 15% from the UK government, ending two years of strike action in England, Wales and Scotland.
  - The latest ONS data shows that inflation was 2.2% in August, unchanged from the previous month.
  - The UK operator of TGI Fridays goes into administration, putting 4,500 jobs at risk.
- 19 September
  - A BBC investigation, which includes testimony from over 20 female ex-employees, reveals serious sexual abuse allegations by the late former Harrods owner Mohamed Al-Fayed.
  - The Bank of England holds interest rates at 5%.
  - BBC News reports that a number of offenders released early from prison to ease overcrowding have yet to be fitted with electronic tags, despite this being a condition of their release.
  - The Met Office issues a yellow warning for thunderstorms for 20 and 21 September following a period of unseasonably warm weather.
  - The final edition of the London Evening Standard is published, before it switches to a weekly format titled The London Standard, published each Thursday from 26 September.
- 20 September
  - The UK's debt-to-GDP reaches 100%, its highest level since 1961.
  - A tornado strikes the Hampshire town of Aldershot, causing damage to properties and trees.
  - The UK operation of the international construction company ISG collapses, with the loss of 2,200 jobs.
  - Steven Wilson, who suffered life-changing injuries after being stabbed as he worked in a prison kitchen while serving a sentence for burglary, is awarded more than £5m in damages by the High Court.
  - The UK government confirms that domestic abuse specialists will be "embedded" in emergency 999 call centres in England and Wales as part of plans to halve the number of incidents of violence against women and girls in ten years.
- 21 September – Daniel Dubois defeats Anthony Joshua at Wembley Stadium to become the International Boxing Federation's heavyweight champion.
- 22 September
  - The Crown Prosecution Service confirms it considered prosecuting Mohamed Al Fayed on two occasions, but concluded there was no realistic prospect of securing a conviction.
  - Secretary of State for Defence John Healey announces that people with asthma and acne will no longer be excluded from joining the British Armed Forces.
- 23 September
  - Heavy rain brings flash flooding and travel disruption to parts of England and Wales.
  - Harrods reveals that it is investigating whether any current members of staff have made allegations against Mohamed Al Fayed.
  - It is reported that in a letter written in 2019, Ministry of Defence officials concluded privately that allegations to be aired in a BBC Panorama on alleged SAS war crimes were “broadly accurate”.
  - The Royal College of Nursing announces that nurses in England have rejected the offer of a 5.5% pay increase from the government.
- 24 September
  - Starmer gives his keynote conference speech, setting out plans for "national renewal" but telling delegates there are no "easy answers".
  - Home Secretary Yvette Cooper announces plans to halve instances of knife crime over the next decade.
  - Legislation making it illegal to own, make, transport or sell "status knives", such as zombie knives and machetes, in England and Wales, comes into force.
  - Israel–Hezbollah conflict (2023–present):
    - The Ministry of Defence announces that 700 British troops will be deployed to Cyprus in anticipation of an evacuation of British citizens from Lebanon.
    - Starmer advises British nationals in Lebanon to "leave immediately" as tension between Hezbollah and Israel increases.
- 25 September – Petrol prices fall to their lowest level in three years, with the average price for a litre of unleaded costing about £1.35.
- 27 September
  - Lexi Secker, a transgender woman who raped a woman on a night out prior to identifying as a woman, is jailed for six and a half years with the sentence to be served in a male prison.
  - Two 13-year-old boys are detained for at least eight and a half years for the 2023 murder of Shawn Seesahai in Wolverhampton, carried out using a machete when they were 12. They are the youngest killers to be sentenced since the murder of James Bulger in 1993.
  - Sir Brian May resigns as vice president of the Royal Society for the Prevention of Cruelty to Animals (RSPCA) over what he describes as "damning evidence" of animal welfare failings related to its food certification label.
- 28 September – Labour MP Rosie Duffield quits the party over what she describes as leader Keir Starmer's "cruel" policies and "staggering hypocrisy" over his acceptance of gifts. In her resignation letter to Starmer she says, "The sleaze, nepotism and apparent avarice are off the scale. I am so ashamed of what you and your inner circle have done to tarnish and humiliate our once proud party." Her resignation is the fastest by an MP following a general election in modern political history.
- 30 September
  - The UK's only remaining coal power plant at Ratcliffe-on-Soar in Nottinghamshire is shut down, ending the country's 142-year history of coal-fired electricity.
  - A 14-year-old girl is treated in hospital after a suspected acid attack outside a school in west London.

=== October ===
- 1 October
  - The price of an average energy bill rises by £149 per year to £1,717.
  - Buckingham Palace announces that Princess Beatrice of York is expecting her second child.
  - A new law requires hospitality sector workers in England, Wales and Scotland to receive all money from tips left by customers.
- 2 October – The first flight chartered by the UK government to evacuate British nationals from Lebanon following the increase in tension between Hezbollah and Israel arrives in the UK with 150 people on board.
- 3 October – The UK announces that it will give up sovereignty of the Chagos Islands to Mauritius, subject to finalisation of a treaty.
- 4 October
  - A Royal Navy investigation finds that women in the Submarine Service have faced misogyny, bullying and other unacceptable behaviour. First Sea Lord Admiral Sir Ben Key, who heads the Royal Navy, apologises and describes such behaviour as "intolerable".
  - The UK government pledges £22bn in investment over the next 25 years for projects to capture and store carbon emissions from energy, industry and hydrogen production.
  - Data published by the Independent Schools Council, the body representing private schools in the UK, indicates a 4.6% fall in the number of private students starting in private sector secondary education in September 2024.
  - 395 migrants cross the English Channel in small boats from France to the UK.
- 5 October
  - A large pro-Palestinian protest, involving tens of thousands of marchers, takes place in central London, coinciding with the first anniversary of the 7 October attacks.
  - French authorities say that 4 people, including a 2-year-old boy, died trying to cross the Channel to the UK.
  - According to the Home Office, 973 people crossed the English Channel on this date in 17 boats, the highest daily number for 2024, making the total number so far for the year 26,612 people in 503 boats.
- 6 October
  - Sue Gray resigns as Downing Street Chief of Staff following revelations that her salary was £3,000 higher than that of the prime minister. In her resignation statement, Gray says she "risked becoming a distraction". Morgan McSweeney is appointed to replace her.
  - Johnnie Walker announces his retirement from broadcasting after 58 years because of ill health.
- 7 October
  - 1,000 jobs are to be lost at fast food restaurant TGI Fridays despite a rescue package after the company went into administration.
  - From this date onwards, all UK payment service providers are required to reimburse victims of authorised push payment fraud. This new regulation supersedes a voluntary code introduced in May 2019, of which only 10 payment service providers were members.
  - The price of a first class stamp increases by 30p to £1.65.
- 8 October
  - In his annual update of security threats posed to the UK, Ken McCallum, the head of MI5, says that Russia's intelligence agency has been on a mission to generate "sustained mayhem on British and European streets".
  - Office for National Statistics data for the year up to June 2023 shows fewer UK births than deaths over a 12-month period for the first time since the 1970s, with 16,300 fewer births occurring, while net migration increased the population by 662,400 to an estimated 68,265,200.
  - Housing and planning minister, Matthew Pennycook, is referred to the parliamentary commissioner for standards for not revealing his close relationship with the author of the Institute for Fiscal Studies paper which Labour ministers have used as evidence to support their introduction of 20% value-added tax (VAT) on private school fees.
- 9 October – The All England Club announces it will adopt electronic line calling from 2025, meaning line judges will disappear from the Wimbledon Championships.
- 10 October
  - A new King Charles III heraldic Coat of Arms, alongside the new Lesser Arms, used by the UK government, both by artist Timothy Noad are officially unveiled.
  - A further 65 women are reported to have contacted the BBC regarding sexual abuse by the late former Harrods owner Mohamed Al-Fayed.
  - The Prince and Princess of Wales visit Southport, where they meet the families of the three children killed in the July stabbing. It is the Princess's first public engagement since her cancer treatment.
  - A technical fault with the BBC Weather website and app leads to incorrect forecasts of hurricane winds in the UK and internationally, with one forecast predicting winds of 13,508 mph in London.
  - Data published by the Home Office shows a 25% rise in reported incidents of religious hate crime over the past 12 months, largely against Muslims and Jews as a result of the Gaza war.
- 11 October
  - Office for National Statistics figures show the UK economy grew by 0.2% during August, following two months of stagnation.
  - Virginia McCullough, who murdered her parents in 2019 then lived in the family home alongside their bodies for four years, is sentenced to life imprisonment with a minimum term of 36 years.
- 12 October
  - Alex Salmond, former first minister of Scotland, dies aged 69 in North Macedonia.
  - A woman in her 20s is reported to have died after going overboard from a cruise ship near the Channel Islands in the early hours.
- 15 October
  - Five people, including two children, are killed in a crash on the M6 in Cumbria.
  - Former Chelsea boss Thomas Tuchel agrees to become the next England manager.
- 16 October
  - Office for National Statistics figures show that UK inflation decreased unexpectedly to 1.7% in the year to September, its lowest level in over three years.
  - A suspected gas explosion destroys three houses in Benwell, Newcastle, killing a seven-year-old boy and a man in his thirties, and hospitalising six other people.
  - The University of Oxford rejects former Prime Minister of Pakistan Imran Khan's application to become chancellor.
- 17 October
  - The National Gallery has banned liquids, such as baby formula and milk, from its premises following a number of attacks on artworks.
  - A 4-month-old baby dies after a boat overloaded with more than 60 migrants sank attempting to cross the Channel from France to England.
  - 2024 United Kingdom riots: Former childminder Lucy Connolly is sentenced to 31 months in prison over an online post in which she called for hotels housing asylum seekers to be set on fire.
- 18 October
  - King Charles III and Queen Camilla arrive in Australia for their royal tour, Charles's first visit to the country since becoming King.
  - The body of Scotland's former first minister, Alex Salmond, is flown back to Scotland from North Macedonia in a private jet paid for by Scottish businessman Tom Hunter.
  - The Met Office warns of strong winds, potentially reaching 80 mph, along with heavy rain, ahead of the expected arrival of Storm Ashley.
  - 647 migrants cross the English Channel.
- 19 October
  - BBC News reports that the UK government is exploring how to hand over ownership of the Post Office to thousands of subpostmasters.
  - In a Sunday Times interview, Olympic cyclist Sir Chris Hoy says that he has been told by doctors he has terminal cancer.
- 20 October
  - The UK government announces plans to appoint a minister to oversee the building of HS2, as well as confirming it will not reinstate the route's Birmingham to Manchester leg.
  - An amber weather alert is in place for western Scotland and the north and west of Northern Ireland as Storm Ashley arrives in the UK; yellow alerts are issued for other parts of Scotland, Northern Ireland and the Welsh coast.
- 21 October
  - Metropolitan Police officer Martyn Blake is cleared of the murder of Chris Kaba, who was shot in Streatham in September 2022.
  - BBC News reports that the Serious Fraud Office is investigating the construction of a hotel and conference centre owned by the Unite union.
  - The UK government announces plans to make more medical records, test results and letters from doctors available on the NHS App.
  - A man dies and 15 people treated in hospital following a low-speed crash between two trains near the village of Llanbrynmair in Powys.
- 22 October
  - Reporting restrictions are lifted on the background of Chris Kaba, who it is revealed was a suspect in a shooting at a nightclub days before his death, and was also a rapper who belonged to the infamous 67 gang, a UK drill group and criminal gang.
  - Figures show that government borrowing rose by £16.6bn in September 2024, the third highest September on record since records began in 1993.
  - The International Monetary Fund increases its growth forecast for the UK from 0.7% (in July) to 1.1%, and says the UK economy is set to "accelerate".
  - The UK government begins a second tranche of early prisoner releases involving 1,100 inmates in order to alleviate prison overcrowding in England and Wales.
- 23 October
  - The National Institute of Health and Care Excellence (NICE) announces that the Alzheimer's drug Donanemab will not be made available on the NHS in England because of its cost and relatively minor benefit to patients.
  - Two survivors of the Manchester Arena bombing win a High Court case against former television producer Richard Hall, who had alleged that the terrorist attack was staged.
  - Charles III and Camilla arrive in Samoa for a state visit, where the King will preside over the 2024 Commonwealth Heads of Government Meeting.
  - Home Secretary Yvette Cooper announces that firearms officers facing trial over shooting suspects will have automatic anonymity until conviction under new reforms.
  - A woman is arrested on suspicion of manslaughter following the deaths of three residents at a care home in Swanage, Dorset.
  - French authorities say 3 people died after a small boat carrying 48 migrants got into trouble attempting to cross the Channel from France to England. This brings the death toll for 2024, so far, to 56. In 2023 there were 12 deaths.
- 24 October
  - It is confirmed that the sale of disposable vapes will be banned in England and Wales from June 2025.
  - Convicted killer Lucy Letby's bid to appeal against her latest conviction for the attempted murder of a baby girl is dismissed by the Court of Appeal.
  - Chancellor Rachel Reeves announces the UK government is to change its self-imposed debt rules in order to make an extra £50bn available for spending at the forthcoming budget.
- 25 October
  - Alexander McCartney, 26, who organised one of the largest catfishing operations on the Internet, is sentenced to life in prison with a minimum term of 20 years. His crimes, which targeted around 3,500 children across 30 countries, are described by Mr Justice O'Hara as ones of "sadism and depravity" which "scarred" the childhoods of his victims.
  - Appearing at the Old Bailey, Dylan Earl pleads guilty to carrying out an arson attack on a Ukrainian-owned business in east London on behalf of Russia.
  - A Scottish couple are given permission to proceed with a legal case that will attempt to overturn the scrapping of universal winter fuel payments for pensioners.
- 27 October – Labour MP Mike Amesbury is suspended from the party and has the whip withdrawn, after CCTV footage emerges appearing to show him punching a man to the ground.
- 28 October
  - Far-right activist Tommy Robinson is sentenced to 18 months in prison for contempt of court for repeating false allegations against a Syrian refugee, in breach of an injunction.
  - Manchester United sack manager Erik ten Hag less than 24 hours after a 2–1 defeat to West Ham United, leaving the club in 14th place after nine games. Assistant Ruud van Nistelrooy takes charge on an interim basis until a permanent replacement is found.
- 30 October
  - October 2024 United Kingdom budget: Rachel Reeves unveils her first budget as chancellor, which includes £40bn in tax rises, intended to offset what she alleges is a £22bn "black hole" in the nation's finances, while enabling the largest hike in NHS funding since 2010.
  - The first case of Clade Ib mpox, a more spreadable variant linked to the outbreak in Africa, is detected in the UK.
- 31 October
  - The Independent Schools Council, which represents around 1,400 private schools in the UK, votes to take legal action against government plans to end their tax exemption status from January 2025.
  - GB News is fined £100,000 by Ofcom for breaking impartiality rules with a programme featuring the former Prime Minister Rishi Sunak.

=== November ===
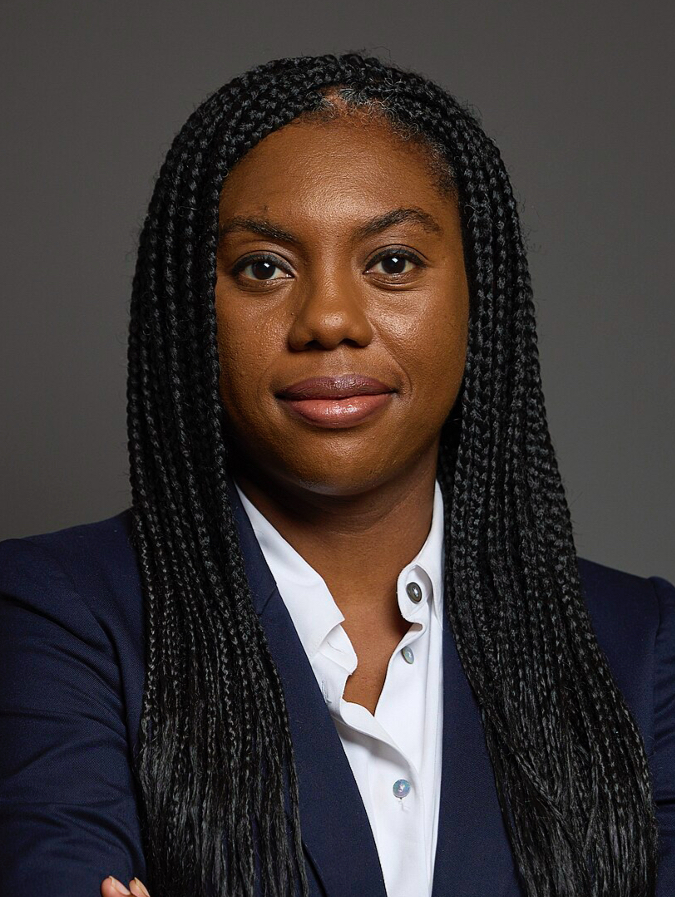
2 November 2024: Kemi Badenoch becomes the new leader of the Conservative Party, succeeding Rishi Sunak.

- 1 November – Sporting's Ruben Amorim is announced as Manchester United's new head coach. He will take charge on 11 November.
- 2 November
  - Kemi Badenoch wins the Conservative leadership election, defeating rival Robert Jenrick after securing the support of party members.
  - A joint investigation carried out by Channel 4's Dispatches and The Sunday Times reveals the extent of rent received by the Royal Estate from schools, the National Health Service and the armed forces.
- 4 November
  - An elderly British couple, reported missing in Spain's recent flash flooding, are found dead in their car.
  - Education Secretary Bridget Phillipson announces that university tuition fees in England, fixed at £9,250 a year since 2017, will be increased from 2025.
  - Two more cases of Clade 1b mpox are identified in the UK, in household contacts of the first patient.
- 5 November
  - Buckingham Palace announces that Queen Camilla has cancelled a number of scheduled engagements due to a chest infection.
  - Health Secretary Wes Streeting announces that the NHS will review its policy on testing for prostate cancer following Sir Chris Hoy's "powerful" call for younger men to get tested.
  - The UK government announces that the Tobacco and Vapes Bill will include plans to ban smoking outside schools and hospitals in England, but will not extend the ban to beer gardens as had been previously proposed.
  - Figures published by the British Retail Consortium indicate a 0.6% growth in retail sales during October, a figure lower than September, and attributed to the later October half term and people waiting for Black Friday deals.
  - Briton Callum Tindal-Draper is killed while fighting with the 4th International Legion in Ukraine.
- 6 November – At Newcastle Crown Court, former GP Thomas Kwan is sentenced to 31 years in prison after posing as a community nurse to inject his mother's partner with a substance that caused him to contract a flesh eating disease following a row over inheritance.
- 7 November
  - The Bank of England cuts the UK interest rate by 0.25% to 4.75%, but indicates further cuts may take longer than previously thought following the October budget, which it forecasts will lead to price increases.
  - Argentinian authorities announce that three people have been charged in connection with the death of One Direction's Liam Payne.
  - A report into more than 100 allegations of sexual abuse against barrister John Smyth QC, who died in 2018, finds his activities were covered up by the Church of England for several decades. Smyth used his home as a Christian summer camp during the 1970s and 1980s, when the abuse of boys and young men is thought to have happened.
  - The Football Association opens a safeguarding inquiry into a Premiership club official following sexual allegations made by three women.
  - The charity organisation Care England estimates that as a result of the increase in employers' National Insurance contributions and the national minimum wage in the recent budget, that the cost of providing care will increase by over £3,000 per person and that the increases are expected to be passed on to care home residents and their relatives.
  - MP for Runcorn and Helsby, Mike Amesbury, is to be charged with common assault, following a police investigation into video footage that appeared to show him punching a man to the ground in the street. Amesbury was suspended from the Labour Party after the video emerged.
  - Following the election of Donald Trump as the president of the US, the foreign secretary, David Lammy, when asked if had changed his mind over his previous description of Trump as a "tyrant" and "a woman-hating, neo-Nazi-sympathising sociopath", chose not to answer that question, instead saying that was "old news".
- 8 November
  - Buckingham Palace confirms that the Princess of Wales will attend Remembrance events alongside the King and Prince of Wales.
  - The Competition and Markets Authority recommends overturning a ban on baby milk price promotions to stop parents "paying over the odds" for formula.
  - The death certificate of Susan McGowan, a 58-year-old nurse from North Lanarkshire who died in September, has linked her death with the use of the weight loss drug tirzepatide (known under the brand name Mounjaro), which was recently approved for use on the NHS; it is reported to be the first UK death linked to the drug's use.
  - Harrods boss Michael Ward apologises over the Mohamed Al-Fayed sexual abuse allegations after being approached by journalists from the BBC.
  - Conspiracy theorist and former television producer Richard Hall is ordered to pay £45,000 in compensation to two victims of the Manchester Arena bombing after alleging the attack was staged.
- 9 November – Buckingham Palace announces that Queen Camilla will miss Remembrance events held over the weekend as she recovers from a chest infection.
- 10 November – First Minister of Northern Ireland Michelle O'Neill becomes the first senior Sinn Féin figure to take part in an official Remembrance Sunday ceremony, held in Belfast.
- 11 November
  - The Terminally Ill Adults (End of Life) Bill, which would allow terminally ill people in England and Wales with less than six months to live to seek assistance in ending their lives, with the consent of two doctors and a High Court judge, is published.
  - Helen-Ann Hartley, the Bishop of Newcastle, calls for Justin Welby to resign as the Archbishop of Canterbury following a damning report into prolific child abuser John Smyth QC, who was associated with the Church of England.
  - At the Old Bailey, former soldier Daniel Khalife changes his plea midway through his trial, and pleads guilty to escaping from prison in September 2023. His trial on three other charges continues.
  - At the invitation of French President Emmanuel Macron, Starmer travels to France to mark Armistice Day at the Tomb of the Unknown Soldier, then holds talks with Macron to affirm the UK and France's commitment to supporting Ukraine.
- 12 November
  - The BBC confirms that Gary Lineker will step down as Match of the Day presenter at the end of the current season, but will host BBC Sport's coverage of the 2026 World Cup.
  - The Archbishop of Canterbury, Justin Welby, announces his resignation following a review of his handling of historical allegations of abuse in the church by the barrister John Smyth QC.
  - The NHS is to start offering Varenicline, a daily pill to help people stop smoking.
  - A man is arrested in Westminster after reports of someone carrying a knife outside the Houses of Parliament.
  - Samantha Harvey wins the Booker Prize for her novel Orbital.
- 13 November
  - The Guardian announces that all 80 of its accounts on social media platform X (formerly Twitter) will stop posting content, due to the social media site's role in spreading far-right conspiracy theories and racism.
  - DIY retailer Homebase collapses into administration, threatening 2,000 jobs.
  - Statistics have revealed that a 26-year-old man from Wales is one of around 50 motorists still allowed to drive, despite exceeding the 30 penalty point limit, having accrued 229 penalty points.
  - Health Secretary Wes Streeting orders a review into the potential cost to the NHS of implementing changes to the law regarding assisted dying.
  - Streeting unveils plans for hospital league tables, and for the managers of failing hospitals to be sacked.
- 14 November
  - Chancellor Rachel Reeves is reported to be planning the "biggest pension reform in decades" by merging council pension schemes into "pension megafunds" hoping they will boost economic growth.
  - Three women who were employees of Harrods allege that they were sexually abused by Mohamed Al-Fayed's brother, Salah between 1989 and 1997.
  - It is announced that folic acid will be added to non-wholemeal wheat flour in the UK to help prevent birth defects.
- 15 November
  - Data from the Office for National Statistics indicates the UK economy grew by 0.1% in the third quarter of 2024, down from 0.5% in the second quarter. The decrease is attributed to uncertainty over Labour's first budget and continued high interest rates.
  - Myles McHugh, a serving Metropolitan Police officer, is dismissed for gross misconduct after having viewed confidential files related to the murder of Sarah Everard without good cause. A tribunal also finds Hannah Rebbeck and Mark Harper guilty of gross misconduct for the same reason. Rebbeck, who has already left the police, would have been dismissed if she were still serving, while Harper is given a final written warning.
  - The Met Office issues a weather warning for snow and ice for southern Scotland and northern England, beginning on 17 November.
  - Figures indicate the cost of mortgages has risen despite a cut in interest rates, with an average two-year fixed term mortgage at 5.5%.
- 16 November – Snow and ice warnings are issued by the Met Office for late Sunday 17 November through to Tuesday 19 November, as cold Arctic air spreads across the United Kingdom.
- 17 November
  - The UK government gives more details on a £1bn investment plan to bring what it calls a "London-style" bus service to the rest of England.
  - Tickets for the 2025 Glastonbury Festival go on sale at 9am, and sell out in 35 minutes.
- 18 November
  - At the 2024 G20 Rio de Janeiro summit, Starmer holds talks with Chinese president Xi Jimping and emphasises the importance of a "strong UK–China relationship" for both countries.
  - Consultancy firm Cornwall Insight forecasts a slight rise in the energy price cap in January, and says that high energy prices will be the "new normal".
  - Thames Valley Police confirm that two vehicles were stolen from a farm on the estate surrounding Windsor Castle in October. The King was not in residence at the time.
  - Research by BBC News has discovered that waiting lists for gynaecology appointments across the UK have more than doubled since February 2020, with 755,046 people currently awaiting treatment.
  - A technical issue leaves a number of British Airways flights stranded at multiple locations as they are unable to take off. The problem is resolved by the following day.
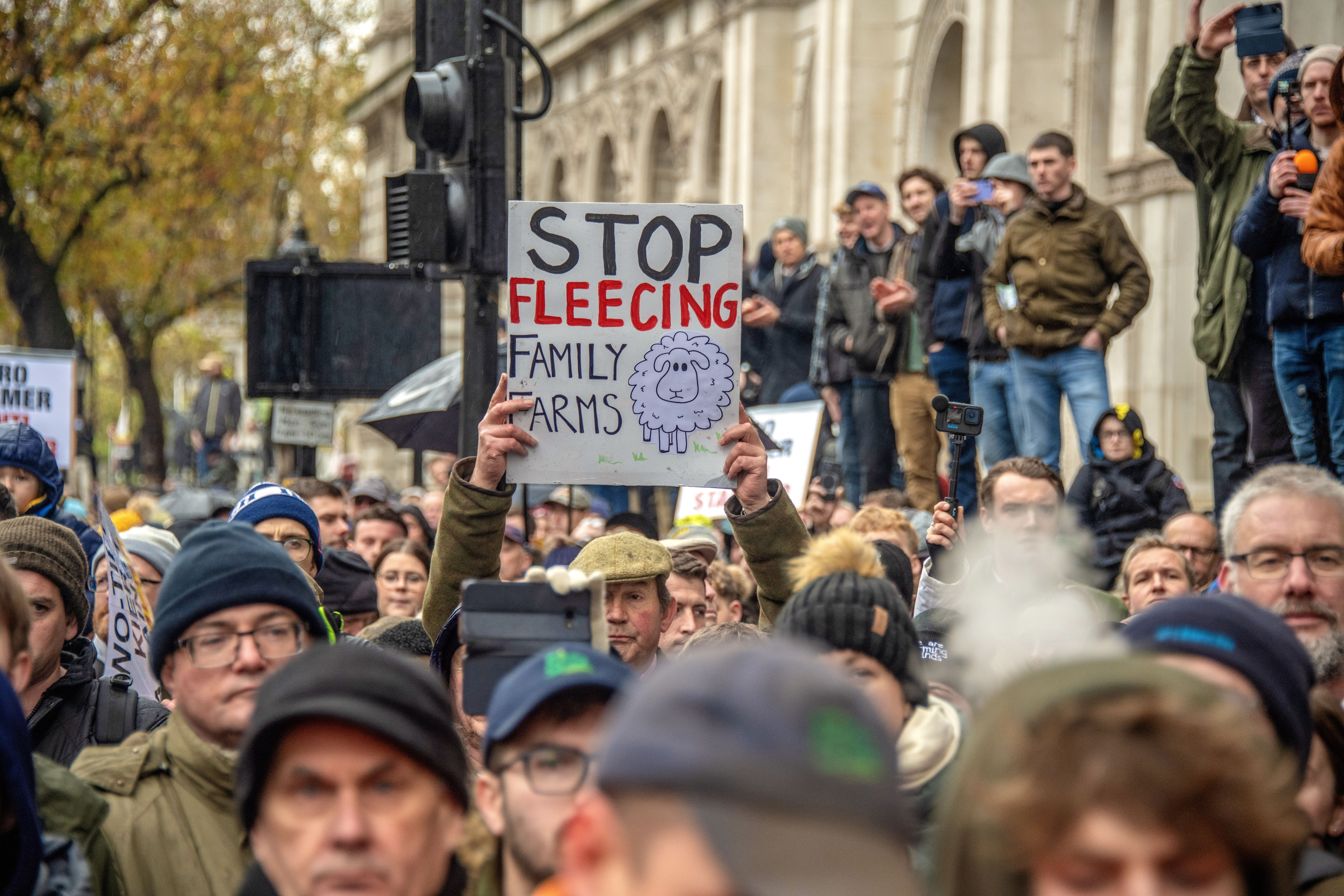
- Protest in London against planned tax changes for farms
  19 November
  - More than 200 schools are closed as snow brings disruption to large areas of the UK. Motorists and commuters are warned of disruption as three yellow warnings for snow and ice remain in effect.
  - Zoe Ball announces that she will step down as presenter of Radio 2's Breakfast Show in December, with Scott Mills replacing her.
  - Several thousand people attend a protest in London over inheritance tax increases for farmers, announced in the October budget.
  - In a letter to Chancellor Rachel Reeves, a group of the UK's high street retailers has warned the "cumulative burden" of tax rises announced in the October budget, as well as other policies already in the pipeline, will add billions in costs to the retail sector and put jobs at risk.
  - The UK government estimates that 50,000 pensioners will be living in poverty in 2025 as a result of cuts to winter fuel payments.
- 20 November
  - Inflation rises from 1.7% to 2.3%, its highest level in six months, driven by rising energy costs.
  - Harrods' newly appointed survivors' advocate Dame Jasvinder Sanghera tells BBC Radio 4's The World at One that Mohamed Al Fayed's sexual abuse could be "something on the scale of Jimmy Savile".
  - UK-supplied Storm Shadow missiles, with a significantly longer range than earlier weapons, are reportedly used for the first time by Ukraine to strike inside Russia.
  - Defence Secretary John Healey announces the early decommissioning of some older defence equipment, such as ships, drones and helicopters in order to save £500m, and despite an "increasing global threat" facing the UK.
- 21 November
  - A Briton, 28-year-old Simone White, is among those reported to have died in a mass poisoning in Laos.
  - A report by the Charity Commission into activities at the Captain Sir Tom Moore Foundation finds that Hannah and Colin Ingram-Moore (Moore's daughter and son-in-law) benefited from their association with the charity, including money from a £1.4m book deal paid to a family company, not to the Foundation.
  - The UK government announces it will overhaul what it describes as the "feudal" leasehold system in England and Wales by the end of the current parliament.
  - A security incident at Buchanan bus station in the centre of Glasgow leads to the evacuation of the area and anti-terror police being called out; around three men are arrested in connection with the incident.
- 22 November
  - Ofgem announces the price of an average energy bill will rise by £21 a year from January 2025, with the typical household paying £1,738 per year; prices are now 50% higher than pre-COVID levels.
  - Data from the Office for National Statistics shows a 0.7% fall in retail sales during October, with people holding back on spending ahead of the budget.
  - Downing Street indicates that Israeli Prime Minister Benjamin Netanyahu would face arrest if he travelled to the UK following the issuing of an international arrest warrant for war crimes by the International Criminal Court.
  - The Investigatory Powers Tribunal rules that 300 people affected by the Manchester Arena bombing cannot continue with a case against MI5 in which they alleged their human rights were breached because the security agency failed to take "appropriate measures" to prevent the attack.
  - The UK government announces plans for new "respect orders" in England and Wales, giving police and local authorities the power to ban those who persistently practice antisocial behaviour from drinking in public places or from entering town centres, with prison sentences of up to two years for those who consistently break the orders.
  - A number of security incidents are reported in London, Gatwick Airport and Chester, involving evacuations and anti-terror police.
  - Queen Camilla misses the Royal Variety Performance because of "lingering post-viral" symptoms from her chest infection.
- 23 November
  - The Ministry of Justice says it is aware of a data breach after details of the layouts of prisons in England and Wales were leaked to the dark web.
  - Kensington Palace announces that the Princess of Wales has invited the families affected by the 2024 Southport stabbing to her annual Christmas carol service.
  - It is reported that Andy Murray will coach his long-time former rival Novak Djokovic at the 2025 Australian Open.
  - Less than five months after Labour won the 2024 general election, an online parliament petition calling for a new general election is launched and receives 200,000 signatures within its first six hours.
- 23–24 November – A number of yellow weather warnings for high winds and heavy rain are in place for Scotland, Northern Ireland, north Wales and northern England as Storm Bert arrives in the UK; there is also an amber alert for snow and ice in central Scotland.
- 24 November
  - BBC News reports that businessman David Crisp, who was recorded telling an undercover reporter he was illegally selling luxury perfume to Russia, will not face criminal charges.
  - An eight-year-old girl and a 34-year-old man are seriously injured in a shooting in Ladbroke Grove, West London. A 22-year-old man is arrested the following day on suspicion of attempted murder.
- 25 November
  - Two Britons are among 17 people reported missing after a tourist boat sank in the Red Sea.
  - Following the impact of Storm Bert, further rain is forecast over the coming two days for northern England and Wales.
  - In an attempt to reassure industry there will not be further tax rises for business, Chancellor Rachel Reeves tells the CBI conference she is "not coming back with more borrowing or more taxes".
  - It is reported that the UK Supreme Court is to decide on the definition of a woman following a case brought by campaigners in Scotland.
- 26 November
  - Vauxhall owner Stellantis announces the closure of its van making facility in Luton, with the loss of 1,100 jobs.
  - Starmer announces an overhaul of the UK jobs market that will see young people guaranteed places on apprenticeships or in training.
  - A yellow weather warning is issued for flooding ahead of the arrival of Storm Conall, which is expected to affect southern England and Wales.
  - The UK government says it has no plans for an extra bank holiday in 2025 to mark the 80th anniversary of VE Day.
  - The City of London Corporation announces that two of Britain's most famous and historic markets – Smithfield and Billingsgate – will close after 850 years of operation.
- 28 November
  - Former British army soldier Daniel Khalife is found guilty of spying for Iran. Justice Bobbie Cheema-Grubb at Woolwich Crown Court says that Khalife will face "a long custodial sentence" when he is sentenced in early 2025.
  - Official figures indicate that net migration reached 906,000 in the year to June 2024, much higher than previously stated.
  - The UK government have agreed an unprecedented deal to work with Iraq to address the problem of people smuggling.
  - Figures show an increase in the number of applications for Pension Credit following cuts to Winter Fuel Payments announced by the Chancellor in the 2024 Spending Review.
  - Shadow Home Secretary Chris Philp suggests that automation and robots could be used instead of hiring low-paid migrant workers, and calls for UK businesses to invest more in these technologies.
- 29 November
  - MPs vote 330 to 275 in favour of allowing assisted dying in England and Wales. The bill passes the first stage in the Commons but will be followed by months of parliamentary activity before it becomes a law.
  - Louise Haigh resigns as Secretary of State for Transport after a past fraud offence comes to light. She is replaced by Heidi Alexander.
  - The UK government announces that the cost of a TV licence will increase by £5 from April 2025 to £174.50.
  - A British man, subsequently named as Tony Kerry, is killed in an incident involving a lift shaft while on holiday in the Turkish coastal resort of Antalya.

=== December ===
- 1 December – In snooker, Judd Trump defeats Barry Hawkins 10–8 to win the 2024 UK Championship, the second time he has won the tournament.
- 2 December
  - Vape maker Supreme agrees a £10m deal to buy Typhoo Tea after the company went into administration.
  - Official figures indicate that 20,000 migrants have crossed the English Channel since the general election.
  - Buckingham Palace announces that Queen Camilla will miss some aspects of the Emir of Qatar's state visit to the UK due to a lingering chest infection.
- 3 December
  - Jess Phillips, the Parliamentary Undersecretary of State for Safeguarding and Violence Against Women and Girls, announces new government plans to give alleged stalking victims "peace of mind" by being told the identity of their alleged abusers before they appear in court.
  - A group of 60 Sri Lankan Tamils who sought asylum in the UK after arriving on the Indian Ocean island of Diego Garcia in 2021 have been brought to the UK, where they are allowed to reside for six months, it is reported.
  - The Financial Times reports that South Western Railway will become the first rail operator to be renationalised when its franchise expires after Parliament passed the Passenger Railway Services (Public Ownership) Act 2024 the previous week. The UK government subsequently confirms that the process, to occur in May 2025, will also include c2c and Greater Anglia later in the year.
  - Fresh allegations of inappropriate sexual behaviour are made against MasterChef presenter Gregg Wallace after he stepped down from the show the previous week.
  - Jasleen Kaur is named as the winner of the 2024 Turner Prize.
- 4 December
  - Cheshire Constabulary confirms they have interviewed Lucy Letby under caution in prison about further baby deaths.
  - The former prime minister, Boris Johnson, accuses Starmer of misleading the House of Commons and says he should correct the record immediately. This follows an exchange in the House during PMQs when Starmer, answering a question from the leader of the opposition, Kemi Badenoch, said that "two of her predecessors had convictions for breaking the Covid rules". Although the former Conservative prime ministers, Johnson and Rishi Sunak had received fixed penalty notices for breaking COVID-19 regulations, neither had any criminal convictions.
- 5 December – The Princess of Wales hosts her annual Christmas carol service at Westminster Abbey.
- 6 December
  - Data published by the Halifax Bank indicates house prices rose by 1.3% in November 2024, marking the fifth consecutive month of growth, with the average house price now estimated at £298,083.
  - Around three million people in Wales and South West England are sent emergency alerts as Storm Darragh approaches the UK.
  - The owners of The Observer confirm the newspaper has been sold to Tortoise Media.
  - The Royal Mint unveils a collector's edition £5 coin featuring Sir Paul McCartney.
  - The UK government announces a £500m contract to build 14 "state-of-the-art" trains at Hitachi's Newton Aycliffe factory, securing the facility's future.
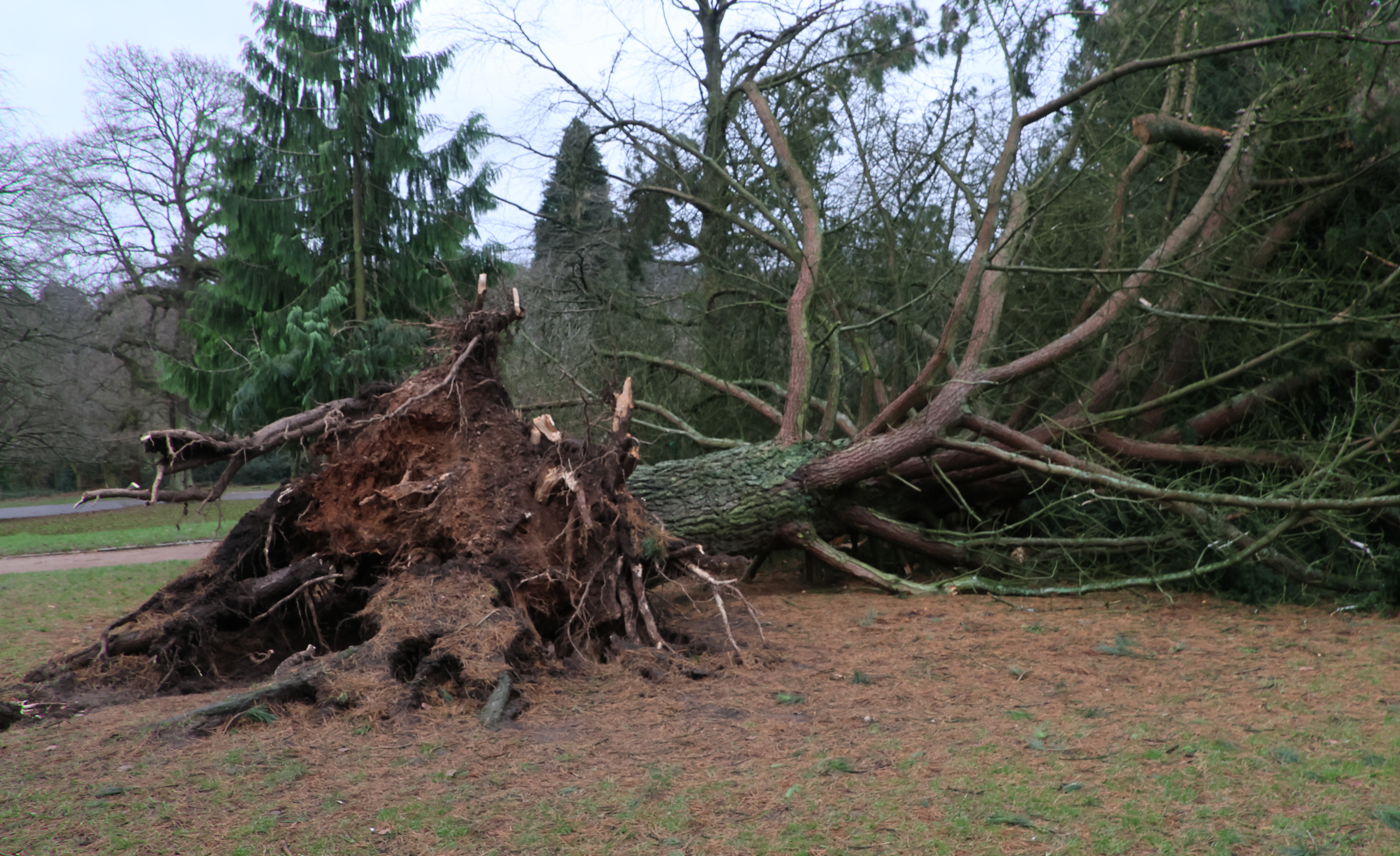
- Tree uprooted by Storm Darragh in Warley Woods
  7 December
  - Storm Darragh: Hundreds of thousands are left without power, while travel is disrupted and many planned events are called off, as winds of up to 93 mph (150 km/h) hit much of the UK, along with heavy rain. A rare red weather warning is in place in Wales and south-west England, meaning the storm poses a risk to life. The deaths of two men are reported, in Birmingham and Lancashire, due to trees falling on vehicles.
  - A 61-year-old Elizabeth line worker dies following a serious assault at Ilford railway station on 4 December. A 28-year-old man is charged with grievous bodily harm, affray, and possession of a prohibited offensive weapon.
- 8 December
  - Prime Minister Sir Keir Starmer welcomes the Fall of the Assad regime in Syria, which he describes as "barbaric", and calls for the restoration of "peace and stability".
  - Emma Pinchbeck, the new chief executive of the UK government's Climate Change Committee, says the UK is "not ready" for the kind of extreme weather brought by Storm Darragh.
  - Prince William helps to serve lunch at The Passage, a London-based homeless charity he first visited with his mother as a boy.
- 9 December – The UK pauses asylum claims from Syrian refugees following the overthrow of Bashar al-Assad.
- 10 December
  - The UK government recommends a 2.8% pay rise for public sector workers from April 2025. In response, the Unison trade union describes the offer as "barely above the cost of living".
  - King Charles III presents the first Elizabeth Emblems, recognising public servants such as police officers and firefighters who died while on duty.
  - Three people are injured, with two hospitalised, after a gas explosion at a house in Ilford, north-east London.
- 11 December
  - Urfan Sharif and Beinash Batool, the father and stepmother of 10-year-old Sara Sharif, are found guilty of her murder in August 2023.
  - Avanti West Coast's train managers have voted to take three days of strike action over the festive period, on 22, 23 and 29 December, in an ongoing dispute about the company's "rest day working arrangements". The strikes are subsequently called off while a new offer is considered.
  - Health Secretary Wes Streeting announces that the ban on giving puberty blockers to under-18s questioning their gender will be made permanent. The Scottish Government subsequently announces it will follow the UK by introducing a permanent ban in Scotland.
  - It is reported that Elon Musk's Tesla car company pushed the newly elected Government of Keir Starmer to make petrol car drivers "pay more" in the days after the general election.
- 12 December
  - HMS Triumph, the Royal Navy's last Trafalgar-class attack submarine, completes its final voyage before being decommissioned.
  - 31-year-old Levi Fishlock is sentenced to nine years in prison for his part in the August riots, during which he set fire to a hotel housing asylum seekers in Rotherham. His sentence is the joint-longest of any handed down so far in relation to the disorder.
  - 609 migrants cross the Channel in nine dinghies, the most ever on a December day since records began in 2018. This brings the total number of people crossing this year to 34,582, almost 20% more than 2023.
- 13 December
  - The UK economy shrinks for the second month in a row, with a 0.1% drop in GDP reported for October.
  - The City of London grants planning approval for 1 Undershaft, a new skyscraper that will be tied with the Shard as western Europe's tallest building.
- 14 December
  - Roisin Quinn, operations director of National Grid plc, confirms that power has been restored to all its customers who experienced outages during Storm Darragh.
  - A number of Irish-themed pubs in the UK have told the BBC they have run out of Guinness after the brewery's owners, Diageo, imposed a limit on supplies in the run up to Christmas.
  - A woman is killed and two men are injured in a shooting in Harlesden, West London.
- 15 December – UK Foreign Secretary David Lammy says that the British government has made "diplomatic contact" with the Syrian rebel group that overthrew the Assad regime. A £50m humanitarian aid package is announced for vulnerable Syrians.
- 16 December
  - BBC News reports that Prince Andrew will not join the Royal family at Sandringham for Christmas following revelations about his links to an alleged Chinese spy.
  - Yang Tengbo is named as the alleged Chinese spy with links to Prince Andrew.
  - Archbishop of York Stephen Cottrell, who is to take temporary charge of the Church of England following the resignation of Justin Welby as Archbishop of Canterbury, faces calls for his resignation over his handling of a sexual abuse case while he was Bishop of Chelmsford.
- 17 December
  - Murder of Sara Sharif: Urfan Sharif, 43, and Beinash Batool, 30, the father and stepmother of Sara Sharif, are sentenced at the Old Bailey for 10-year-old Sara Sharif's murder. Sharif receives a minimum term of 40 years, while Batool is given 33 years, with Justice Cavanagh describing their crimes as "a campaign of torture" in which "the degree of cruelty is almost inconceivable". The girl's uncle, Faisal Malik, 29, is imprisoned for 16 years.
  - Former Archbishop of Canterbury George Carey resigns as a priest following a BBC investigation into the Church of England's handling of a sexual abuse case and revelations that he allowed a priest convicted of sexual abuse to return to clerical duties.
  - In Plymouth, a man is taken to hospital after being shot in the chest by an air rifle.
  - Data from the Office for National Statistics indicates average pay increased at an annual rate of 5.2% between August and October 2024, the first increase for a year, and larger than expected.
  - Train managers at Avanti West Coast vote to take strike action on New Year's Eve, 2 January, and every Sunday from 12 January until May after rejecting a deal aimed at resolving a dispute over rest day working.
- 18 December
  - Office for National Statistics data indicates UK inflation rose to 2.6% in November, the second consecutive monthly increase.
  - Deputy assistant commissioner Vicki Evans, senior national co-ordinator for Counter Terrorism Policing, warns that the UK faces a "smouldering" terror threat level with children as young as ten accessing extreme online material.
  - The UK government announces plans to recruit hundreds of driving instructors to deal with a backlog of people waiting to take driving tests.
- 19 December
  - The Bank of England votes to hold the UK interest rate at 4.75%, they say because the economy is performing worse than expected following the autumn budget.
  - Ofwat announces that water bills in England and Wales are to increase over the next five years, starting with an average rise of £86 per year from April 2025.
- 20 December
  - Peter Mandelson is appointed as the next UK ambassador to the United States.
  - Office for National Statistics figures indicate UK retail sales increased by 0.2% in November, less than the 0.5% forecast by economists.
  - Office for National Statistics data indicates government borrowing was at its lowest for three years in November, with government debt at £11.2bn.
  - The final edition of The Zoe Ball Breakfast Show is broadcast, with Zoe Ball stepping down as presenter of the Radio 2 morning show.
  - Wham!'s "Last Christmas" becomes Christmas number one for the second consecutive year, beating songs by Mariah Carey, Gracie Abrams, Tom Grennan and Ariana Grande.
- 21 December
  - Wildlife TV presenter Chris Packham and former Green Party MP Caroline Lucas quit as president and vice-president of the RSPCA, in response to alleged animal cruelty at some of the charity's approved list of abattoirs.
  - Strong winds cause travel disruption for parts of the UK, as millions of people travel ahead of Christmas. Gusts of up to 82 mph are reported, with yellow weather warnings in place for Scotland, and much of Northern Ireland and northern England.
- 22 December
  - Strong winds continue to cause disruption in parts of the UK, with Heathrow Airport cancelling around 100 flights.
  - A BBC News investigation discovers that a Church of England priest at the centre of a sexual abuse case was twice reappointed to a senior role during Archbishop of York Stephen Cottrell's time as Bishop of Chelmsford. In response, Cottrell says he regrets the handling of the incident.
- 23 December
  - Revised Office for National Statistics data shows economic growth was at 0% between July and September.
  - A number of Morrisons stores have been beset with technical problems regarding discounts and deliveries.
  - Chocolate manufacturer Cadbury is stripped of its Royal Warrant of Appointment after being included on the list of Appointments since 1854.
- 24 December
  - Two NHS hospitals in London are reported to be trialling artificial intelligence (AI) in order to detect signs of type 2 diabetes in patients.
  - The UK government announces that the UK motor industry is being consulted on how the phasing out of petrol and diesel engines by 2030 would work.
  - The Met Office forecasts mild and dry weather for Christmas Day throughout much of the UK.
- 25 December
  - Off Dunkirk on the north coast of France, French authorities rescue 30 people from a small boat, whilst allowing those wishing to cross the Channel to England, to continue into British waters to be taken into the custody of British authorities.
  - A man is arrested on suspicion of attempted murder after four people were injured when they were hit by a car being driven on the wrong side of the road in Shaftesbury Avenue, central London.
  - King Charles III delivers the Royal Christmas Message from London's Fitzrovia Chapel, where he praises health workers and calls for unity following the summer riots.
  - Archbishop of York Stephen Cottrell delivers a Christmas message in place of the Archbishop of Canterbury, doing so as he prepares to assume acting charge of the Church of England.
- 26 December – Data collected by MRI Software indicates a 4% decrease in the number of Boxing Day shoppers compared to the same day in 2023.
- 27 December
  - The Prime Minister pays tribute to Nick Starmer, his younger brother who died from cancer the previous day. Conservative leader Kemi Badenoch expresses her condolences.
  - Flights to and from some of the UK's major airports, including Gatwick and Manchester, are disrupted due to fog.
  - Former Conservative Justice Secretary David Gauke, who is leading a review into sentencing and prison overcrowding, calls for greater use of open prisons in order to ease the pressure on closed category prisons.
  - A man is charged with four counts of attempted murder and remanded in custody over an incident involving a car in London on Christmas Day.
- 28 December – Fog continues to disrupt flights at UK airports.
- 29 December
  - Weather warnings for rain, snow, and winds of up to 70 mph are issued for parts of the UK on New Year's Eve and New Year's Day.
  - Fog continues to disrupt flights to and from Gatwick Airport, doing so for a third consecutive day.
- 30 December
  - The King and the Prime Minister pay tribute to Jimmy Carter, following the former US president's death at the age of 100.
  - Edinburgh's Hogmanay celebrations are cancelled amid weather warnings for heavy rain, high winds and snow over the New Year.
  - Authorities in Argentina announce that five people have been charged in connection with the death of One Direction singer Liam Payne.
  - 2025 New Year Honours: Those recognised in the New Year Honours include Stephen Fry, Gareth Southgate, Sadiq Khan and Andy Street, who receive knighthoods, Emily Thornberry (DBE), Sarah Lancashire (CBE) and Keely Hodgkinson (MBE).
- 31 December – The death is announced of BBC Radio 2 presenter Johnnie Walker at the age of 79.

== See also ==
- Parliament of the United Kingdom
- Politics in the United Kingdom
- 2020s in United Kingdom political history
- 2024 in United Kingdom politics and government
- 2024 in British music
- 2024 in British television
- 2024 in British radio
- List of British films of 2024
