= 2024 in United Kingdom politics and government =

A list of events relating to politics and government in the United Kingdom during 2024.

== Events ==
=== January ===
- 1 January –
  - In his New Year address, Archbishop of Canterbury Justin Welby urges politicians to treat their opponents as human beings rather than enemies.
  - Secretary of State for Defence Grant Shapps says that British forces are ready to act against Houthi rebels targeting cargo ships in the Red Sea.
  - Writing on X, Doug Barrowman, husband of Michelle, Baroness Mone, said it "suits the agenda" of ministers to "scapegoat" him and his wife as a means of distracting from government "incompetence" at failing to procure personal protective equipment during the COVID-19 pandemic.
- 2 January – The Home Office says it has fulfilled a pledge to clear a "legacy" backlog of 92,000 asylum applications lodged before July 2022. But after it subsequently emerges that over 4,000 cases are still waiting for a decision, the Office for Statistics Regulation (OSR) announces an examination of the figures the next day.
- 3 January –
  - Sir Ed Davey, leader of the Liberal Democrats, launches the party's election campaign by targeting constituencies with Conservative MPs.
  - Former chancellor of the exchequer Nadhim Zahawi makes a guest appearance in the ITV drama Mr Bates vs The Post Office as himself, questioning Post Office chief executive Paula Vennells in a 2015 House of Commons committee inquiry into the Horizon computer system.
  - Richard Tice, leader of Reform UK, rules out a pact with the Conservative Party at the next general election.
- 4 January – Prime Minister Rishi Sunak says his "working assumption" is that the general election will take place in the second half of this year.
- 5 January – Chris Skidmore, MP for Kingswood, announces his intention to stand down from Parliament "as soon as possible" in protest at the UK government's decision to issue more oil and gas licences. His decision triggers another by-election.
- 6 January –
  - Government papers seen by the BBC indicate Sunak had significant doubts about sending migrants to Rwanda when he was chancellor, and wanted to scale back the plans.
  - Jeremy Miles rules out reversing Wales's 20 mph speed limit if he becomes first minister.
- 7 January –
  - Sunak describes the Post Office scandal as "an appalling miscarriage of justice" and says the government is looking at ways to clear the names of those convicted because of faulty IT software.
  - Helen Harrison, the partner of former Conservative MP Peter Bone, is chosen by the Conservatives to contest the 2024 Wellingborough by-election.
  - The Independent Parliamentary Standards Authority is to investigate allegations that Pensions Minister Paul Maynard breached Parliamentary rules by using public funds to pay for Conservative Party work and campaigns.
  - Sir Keir Starmer admits he worries about the toll of a general election year on his two teenage children as he and his wife try to keep them out of the public eye.
- 8 January –
  - Green Party co-leader Carla Denyer confirms the party intends to stand a candidate in every constituency in England and Wales at the forthcoming general election, the first time it has fielded a full list of candidates at an election.
  - SNP MP Joanna Cherry demands an apology from colleague Mhairi Black, who suggested some members of the party are "too comfortable" at Westminster.
  - Former Minister Sir Alok Sharma announces he would vote against the Offshore Petroleum Licensing Bill, describing plans to guarantee annual oil and gas licensing rounds as "a total distraction" that reinforce the idea the UK is "not serious" about tackling climate change.
  - British Post Office scandal: Labour Party leader Keir Starmer, who was Director of Public Prosecutions during the scandal, faces questions over why he failed to intervene in the prosecution of innocent sub-postmasters at the time.
- 9 January
  - Economists say that funding the student loans system in England is expected to cost the government an extra £10 billion a year.
  - British Post Office scandal:
    - Secretary of State for Justice Alex Chalk tells Parliament the UK government is giving "serious consideration" to introducing legislation to quash the convictions of the 700 or so sub post masters who were prosecuted as a result of the Horizon IT scandal.
    - Former Post Office chief executive Paula Vennells announces that she would hand back her CBE after more than a million people signed a petition calling for her to do so.
    - Liberal Democrat leader Ed Davey, who was Post Office minister during the scandal, comes under pressure to return his knighthood.
  - Downing Street confirms that Akshata Murty, the wife of the prime minister, has donated her shares in a childcare company to charity. The shares were at the centre of a conflict-of-interest controversy.
- 10 January –
  - British Post Office scandal:
    - Prime Minister Rishi Sunak announces that emergency legislation would be brought through Parliament to "swiftly exonerate and compensate victims" of the Post Office scandal in England and Wales.
    - First Minister of Scotland Humza Yousaf confirms those in Scotland convicted because of the scandal would also be cleared, and that he would work with the UK government to bring this about.
- 11 January –
  - The Liberal Democrats ask Ofcom to investigate GB News over alleged bias in its coverage of the Post Office scandal, including what the party's deputy leader, Daisy Cooper, describes as "a fictitious monologue" Nigel Farage delivered about Sir Ed Davey, which she says contained "a number of factual inaccuracies".
  - First Minister of Scotland Humza Yousaf confirms that the Scottish Government would "in essence replicate" the law in England and Wales banning unlicensed ownership of American XL bully dogs.
  - Sunak authorises joint UK–US air strikes against Houthi rebels following attacks against cargo shipping targets in the Red Sea.
- 12 January –
  - The Liberal Democrats, Scottish National Party and Plaid Cymru call for a recall of parliament to enable a vote on RAF involvement in the air strikes against Houthi rebels in Yemen, since Parliament had already risen for the weekend when Sunak authorised the UK's participation.
  - Sunak authorises talks between the Labour Party and the civil service ahead of a general election later in the year to ensure a smooth transition if Labour becomes the party of government.
  - British Post Office scandal:
    - Court documents reveal that Fujitsu, the company at the centre of the Post Office scandal, won a £184m contract by the Foreign and Commonwealth Office in 2021, despite concerns the system it was offering was "unfit for purpose".
    - Court documents show that former prime minister Sir Tony Blair was warned the Horizon IT system could be "possibly unreliable" before it was rolled out, and raised concerns about it, but gave it the green light after receiving reassurance from others, including his Secretary of State for Trade and Industry Peter Mandelson.
- 13 January – Yvonne Tracey, a former deputy postmistress from New Malden, south London, announces her intention to stand in the Parliamentary constituency of Kingston and Surbiton, Sir Ed Davey's seat, at the next general election.
- 14 January – Foreign Secretary David Cameron tells the BBC that military action was taken against Houthi rebels because the strikes were needed after months of attacks against cargo ships, and that the UK is "prepared to back our words with actions".
- 15 January –
  - Sunak tells Parliament that air strikes against Houthi targets were meant as a "limited, single action" but that the UK "will not hesitate to protect our security, our people and our interests where required".
  - James Stockan announces he is stepping down from the post of leader of Orkney Islands Council, as well as relinquishing his council seat, after six years in the role.
- 16 January –
  - Analysis shows that Labour would need a record swing of 12.7% in votes at the next general election to win a majority in the House of Commons.
  - Lee Anderson and Brendan Clarke-Smith resign their positions as Deputy Chairmen of the Conservative Party, after saying they would back rebel amendments on the Rwanda bill. Jane Stevenson also resigns as a Parliamentary Private Secretary so she can vote for the amendment.
  - The fifteen-year time limit on voting eligibility for British citizens living abroad is abolished under the Elections Act 2022, enabling a further two million people to register to vote in UK elections.
- 17 January –
  - The UK government is seeking legal expenses from the Scottish Government over its challenge against the veto of the Gender Recognition Reform (Scotland) Bill.
  - The current session of the 7th Northern Ireland Assembly is suspended following the failure of Democratic Unionist Party to support nominations to elect Mike Nesbitt (UUP) or Patsy McGlone (SDLP) to the role of Speaker of the Northern Ireland Assembly.
  - The Safety of Rwanda (Asylum and Immigration) Bill passes its third reading in the House of Commons with MPs voting 320–276 in favour of the bill.
- 18 January – The UK Statistics Authority rebuked the prime minister for misleading the public over the backlog of asylum applications, which he said in a social media post had been cleared, while several thousand still remained. The UKSA said the allegation could have affected public trust in the government.
- 19 January –
  - The European Court of Human Rights announces that Ireland launched legal action against the United Kingdom on 17 January over the Northern Ireland Troubles (Legacy and Reconciliation) Act 2023.
  - The UK government gives its backing to the Pet Abduction Bill, a private member's bill that makes it illegal to steal cats and dogs in England and Northern Ireland.
- 20 January – A speech to the Fabian Society conference by Shadow Foreign Secretary David Lammy is interrupted by pro-Palestinian protestors.
- 21 January – Scotland's First Minister, Humza Yousaf, tells the BBC's Sunday with Laura Kuenssberg he is willing to work with Sir Keir Starmer if he becomes prime minister after the next general election.
- 22 January –
  - The House of Lords votes 214–171 in favour of an amendment to the Safety of Rwanda (Asylum and Immigration) Bill that calls for the delay of ratification of the bill until Rwanda improves its asylum procedures.
  - The UK government rejects calls from Welsh MPs to add the Six Nations Championship to the list of guaranteed free-to-air sporting events on British television.
- 23 January –
  - Following more air strikes against Houthi targets, Sunak tells Parliament the UK would not hesitate to launch further strikes if the rebel group continue to attack shipping targets in the Red Sea, but does not seek confrontation with them.
  - Chris Heaton-Harris, the Secretary of State for Northern Ireland, announces the deadline to call the next Northern Ireland Assembly election would be extended until 8 February to allow the DUP to hold further talks about restarting the Northern Ireland Executive.
- 24 January –
  - In a BBC interview, Conservative MP Simon Clarke calls for Rishi Sunak to be ousted as prime minister, then later says he is acting alone in his comments.
  - Retired British Army officer Colonel Tim Collins is selected to run as the UUP candidate for North Down at the next general election.
  - Andy Street, the mayor of the West Midlands, announces that he and his Manchester counterpart, Andy Burnham, are to meet Mark Harper, the Secretary of State for Transport, to discuss proposals for a privately funded alternative to the abandoned Manchester leg of HS2.
- 25 January – The UK has walked away from trade deal negotiations with Canada after failing to agree on how much access UK producers should have to the Canadian cheese market.
- 26 January –
  - The Crown Prosecution Service has frozen assets belonging to former Conservative peer Michelle Mone and her husband Doug Barrowman, a spokesman for the couple says.
  - Wales's Education Minister, Jeremy Miles, criticises the way Wales' largest trade union, Unite, declared its preferred candidate for the Welsh Labour leadership election. The union held a hustings with the two candidates before announcing its support for Vaughan Gething.
  - Michael Keegan, husband of Education Secretary Gillian Keegan and former chief executive of Fujitsu UK during the Post Office scandal, resigns from a part-time role with the Cabinet Office.
  - The Shared Parental Leave and Pay (Bereavement) Bill, which guarantees parents immediate leave upon starting a job if their partner dies in childbirth, passes its first stage in the House of Commons.
  - The UK government announces a fresh investigation into the sale of the Daily Telegraph after UAE-based RedBird IMI made an eleventh-hour change to the details of its bid to purchase the newspaper.
- 27 January – Kemi Badenoch, the business secretary, asks Henry Staunton to step down as chair of Post Office Limited after 13 months in the role, as the government moves to strengthen governance at the Post Office in the wake of the long-running Horizon IT scandal.
- 28 January – Former MP and cabinet minister Nadine Dorries says she would repay £16,876 in severance pay she received by mistake, as she was too old to qualify for the payment.
- 29 January –
  - Labour MP Kate Osamor is suspended from the party after saying the Gaza conflict should be remembered as genocide in a post about Holocaust Memorial Day.
  - George Freeman, the Conservative MP for Mid Norfolk, says that he resigned from his role in the Sunak ministry in November 2023 because he could not afford to pay his mortgage on the £118,300 ministerial salary after his mortgage increased from £800 to £2,000 per month.
  - Colum Eastwood, the leader of the Social Democratic and Labour Party, says he "cannot in good conscience" attend this year's St Patrick's Day celebration at White House because of the US response to the Gaza war.
  - Following the first debate of the Safety of Rwanda (Asylum and Immigration) Bill in the House of Lords, Peers vote 206–84 to move the bill on to the next stage of its passage through the House.
  - The Democratic Unionist Party endorses a deal aimed at restoring the Northern Ireland Executive.
- 30 January –
  - During a visit to the Middle East, Foreign Secretary David Cameron says that the UK is ready to bring forward the moment when it is ready to recognise a Palestinian state.
  - Members of the Senedd vote 39–14 to back the Senedd Reform Bill which expands the legislature to 96 members at the 2026 Senedd election and change the way members are elected.
  - The Media Bill, which proposes changes to radio in the United Kingdom such as reducing regulations for commercial radio and improving access through smart devices, passes its third reading in the House of Commons.
- 31 January –
  - 2024 Northern Ireland Executive Formation: Details of a deal between the UK government and Democratic Unionist Party aimed at restoring the Northern Ireland Executive are published. It includes reducing checks and paperwork on goods moving between Great Britain and Northern Ireland.
  - Shadow Chancellor Rachel Reeves confirms that Labour would not reintroduce the cap on bankers' bonuses if they form a government after the next general election.

=== February ===
- 1 February –
  - A Statutory Instrument paving the way for the Northern Ireland Executive to be re-established is passed by the House of Commons.
  - Conservative MP Mike Freer announces he is standing down from Parliament at the next election following death threats and an arson attack on his constituency office. Downing Street describes the situation as "an attack on democracy".
  - Addressing a meeting of business leaders, Shadow Chancellor Rachel Reeves says that Labour would not increase corporation tax if elected, but may cut it to boost "competitiveness".
  - Penny Mordaunt, the Leader of the House of Commons, has argued plans to expand the Senedd from 60 to 96 MSs would be the equivalent of expanding the House of Commons from 650 to 2,000 MPs.
  - MP Christina Rees is readmitted to the Labour Party but announces her retirement at the next general election.
- 2 February – Senior Labour MP Darren Jones confirms that the party has ditched its commitment to spend £28bn a year on green investment schemes if it wins the next general election.
- 3 February –
  - 2024 Northern Ireland Executive Formation:
    - The Northern Ireland Assembly meets to elect a new Speaker. Edwin Poots, a former leader of the DUP, is chosen to be the Assembly's 7th Speaker.
    - The Northern Ireland Executive is restored after the DUP ends its two year boycott; Sinn Féin's Michelle O'Neill is nominated as First Minister, becoming the first nationalist politician to hold the post, while the DUP's Emma Little-Pengelly is appointed deputy.
    - SDLP MLA Matthew O'Toole is nominated as Leader of the Opposition.
    - Justin McNulty is suspended from the SDLP for leaving the Assembly sitting early to manage Laois GAA at a Gaelic football match in Wexford.
  - Sir Bob Neill, MP for Bromley and Chislehurst, announces he is stand down at the next election to spend more time with his wife, who has suffered a stroke.
- 4 February –
  - Dafydd Wigley, a former leader of Plaid Cymru, warns that reforms to Wales's political system pose "a very great danger" since it would destroy the relationship between voters and the people they elect.
  - Prime Minister Rishi Sunak arrives in Northern Ireland to visit ministers following the restoration of the Executive.
- 5 February –
  - Sunak visits Stormont along with Taoiseach Leo Varadkar to mark the restoration of the Northern Ireland Executive.
  - Sunak is criticised by opposition parties after appearing to agree to a £1,000 bet on the Rwanda asylum plan, that the first flight to Rwanda would take off before the election. He subsequently says the challenge, put forward by TalkTV presenter Piers Morgan, took him by surprise, but that it was not a mistake to accept it.
  - Sunak says the government has "not made enough progress" on cutting NHS waiting lists in England, but that industrial action "has had an impact".
  - The UK government sets out its Disability Action Plan, which includes measures to protect people with assistance dogs from being illegally refused entry to businesses.
  - The UK government launches a six-week consultation on plans for Martyn's Law, which would make provisions to better protect the public against potential acts of terrorism.
- 6 February –
  - Former Chancellor of the Exchequer Kwasi Kwarteng announced he is stepping down from Parliament at the next election.
  - The UK government gives Birmingham City Council to go-ahead to increase its Council Tax by 10% from April.
  - Welsh Government minister Hannah Blythyn announces that the Welsh Government is taking over South Wales Fire and Rescue Service after it was found to have a culture of harassment and misogynism.
  - Elena Whitham resigns from the post of Minister for Drugs and Alcohol Policy for health reasons.
  - Former prime minister Liz Truss launches a campaign to "galvanise" the UK's "secret Conservatives" and fight back against the "left wing extremists" she says have taken over the UK's institutions.
- 7 February –
  - Sunak faced a call from a Labour MP to apologise after he ridiculed Starmer over his U-turn on "defining a woman" at Prime Minister's Questions.
  - Met Office data obtained by BBC Verify raises questions over UK government suggestions that poor weather conditions had no impact on a fall in English Channel migrant crossings during 2023. The number of crossings were fewer than during the previous year, which the government had said was nothing to do with the weather, but the figures suggest there were fewer days during 2023 when compared to 2022 when migrants could successfully cross the Channel.
- 8 February –
  - Labour scraps its plans for a £28bn annual green investment, with Sir Keir Starmer saying the policy is unaffordable because of the Conservatives' economic record. In response, Sunak says Starmer "U-turns on major things, he can't say what he would do differently". Momentum says the announcement "represents yet another capitulation to right-wing interests".
  - Michael Matheson resigns as Scotland's Health Secretary ahead of the publication of a report into £11,000 of data roaming charges accrued by his Parliamentary iPad. He is replaced by Neil Gray.
  - Northern Ireland Health Minister Robin Swann confirms he is the Ulster Unionist Party candidate for the Westminster constituency of South Antrim at the next general election.
- 9 February –
  - 2024 Special Honours:
    - The 2024 Special Honours are announced. They include Plaid Cymru nominee Carmen Smith, a former public affairs adviser for the party, who at 27, becomes the youngest member of the House of Lords.
    - Donald Cameron, a Conservative list MSP for the Highlands and Islands, announces he is standing down from the Scottish Parliament to take up a seat in the House of Lords and a junior ministerial post in the Scottish Office.
  - Details of Sunak's earnings for 2023 are published, showing he paid £508,308 in tax on earnings of around £2.2m.
  - The Mayor's and City of London Court rules that the Green Party discriminated against former deputy leader Dr Shahrar Ali after dismissing him during a row over his gender critical beliefs.
  - The Conservatives unexpectedly gain Crewe Central from Labour in a Cheshire East Council by-election.
- 11 February – Azhar Ali, Labour's candidate in the Rochdale by-election, apologises after a recording of him reportedly saying that Israel had "allowed" the deadly attack by Hamas gunmen on 7 October was obtained by The Mail on Sunday. Labour condemns his remarks but continues to offer its support to his candidacy.
- 12 February –
  - Labour withdraws its support for Rochdale candidate Azhar Ali.
  - Tracey Crouch, MP for Chatham and Aylesford, announces she is standing down from Parliament at the next general election.
  - Prime Minister Rishi Sunak appears on an hour long GB News People's Forum, where a selected audience of undecided voters are invited to ask him questions. The programme is presented by Stephen Dixon.
- 13 February – Labour withdraws its support for Graham Jones, the former MP for Hyndburn, who was going to contest the seat at the next general election, after it emerges he attended a meeting at which Azhar Ali made comments about Israel.
- 14 February –
  - Former Labour Party leader Neil Kinnock endorses Vaughan Gething to lead Welsh Labour as the next First Minister of Wales.
  - Conservative MP Tobias Ellwood tells BBC Radio 4's PM programme that politicians cannot be viewed as "fair game" after a large-scale pro-Palestinian protest outside his family home.
- 15 February –
  - By-elections take place in Wellingborough and Kingswood. Labour's Gen Kitchen takes Wellingborough, the Conservative Peter Bone's former seat, which he had held with a majority of more than 18,000. The swing of 28.5% is the second largest swing from Conservative to Labour at a by-election since the Second World War. Labour's Damien Egan overturns an 11,220 Conservative majority in Kingswood to win Chris Skidmore's former seat.
  - Atiqul Hoque, the Conservative mayor of Salisbury, is expelled from the Conservative Party over antisemitic remarks made on social media and WhatsApp.
- 16 February –
  - The Labour Party releases a summary of the tax paid by Sir Keir Starmer during 2023, showing he paid just under £100,000 in tax.
  - The ballot to elect the next leader of Welsh Labour opens.
  - Craig Browne resigns as deputy leader of Cheshire East Council, saying he can no longer afford to do the role on the £30,000 annual salary.
- 17 February – Delegates at the Scottish Labour Party conference pass a resolution calling for an immediate ceasefire in Gaza.
- 18 February –
  - Henry Staunton, the former chairman of the Post Office, tells The Sunday Times that Business Secretary Kemi Badenoch told him "Someone's got to take the rap" when he was dismissed from the post. In response Badenoch describes his comments as a "disgraceful misrepresentation" of their conversation.
  - Labour Party leader Sir Keir Starmer calls for a "ceasefire that lasts" in Gaza.
- 19 February –
  - GOV.UK updates the Royal Cypher Crown, replacing Queen Elizabeth IIs St Edward's Crown with the Tudor Crown used by King Charles III.
  - Business Secretary Kemi Badenoch tells the House of Commons that allegations by Henry Staunton, the former chair of the Post Office, that he was told to delay compensation payments for sub-postmasters are "completely false".
  - The UK government announces plans for new measures on holiday homes in England to stop local people being priced out of being able to live in their community.
  - Ofcom launches an impartiality investigation into GB News's Q&A session with prime minister Rishi Sunak.
  - The UK government announces that a scheme allowing Ukrainian nationals to join relatives in the UK has closed to new applicants.
  - Birmingham City Council announces plans to raise council tax by 21% over the next two years as part of £300m in budget cuts.
- 20 February –
  - BBC News reports that the Cameron government were aware that the Post Office had ended a 2016 investigation that could have helped several sub-postmasters wrongly convicted as a result of the Horizon IT scandal.
  - Labour calls for an immediate humanitarian ceasefire in Gaza, the first time it has called for a ceasefire since the Israel–Hamas conflict began.
  - In a statement on the Israel–Hamas conflict, the Prince of Wales calls for an "end to the fighting as soon as possible".
  - David Neal is dismissed from the post of Independent Chief Inspector of Borders and Immigration after he was quoted in articles criticising the immigration system in both The Times and the Daily Mail.
  - An independent panel upholds the Parliamentary Commissioner for Standards' decision that Scott Benton, MP for Blackpool South, should face a 35-day suspension from Parliament. The suspension will now be voted on by MPs and could trigger another by-election.
  - Heather Woodbridge, aged 29, is appointed as leader of Orkney Islands Council, becoming Scotland's youngest council leader and the first woman to lead Orkney Islands Council.
- 21 February –
  - An Opposition day House of Commons debate calling for a ceasefire in Gaza descends into chaos after Speaker Sir Lindsay Hoyle breaks with Parliamentary convention to allow a vote on a Labour amendment calling for an "immediate humanitarian ceasefire" over the scheduled SNP motion calling for an "immediate ceasefire". The decision leads to protests from both Conservative and SNP MPs, who walk out of the House, leaving Labour's motion to be nodded through when the other two parties do not take part in the vote. Amid calls for his resignation, Hoyle says that he allowed the House to vote on the Labour motion so MPs could express their view on "the widest range of propositions", and to protect MPs' safety.
  - King Charles III is seen back at work and meeting Prime Minister Rishi Sunak, the first time he has been seen back at work since his cancer diagnosis.
  - Senior civil servant Sarah Munby writes to the Business Secretary to reject allegations by former Post Office chairman Henry Staunton that he was told to delay compensation payments to victims of the Horizon scandal.
- 22 February –
  - More than 60 MPs have signed a House of Commons motion calling for the resignation of Speaker Sir Lindsay Hoyle.
  - The Independent Parliamentary Standards Authority launches an investigation into allegations that Pensions Minister Paul Maynard used public funds to finance his campaign.
  - The UK government announces that legislation will be introduced to clear hundreds of sub-postmasters in England and Wales who were wrongly convicted as a result of the Horizon IT scandal.
  - Argyll and Bute Council votes to raise its council tax by 10%, and rejects the Scottish Government's council tax freeze by doing so.
  - Former prime minister Liz Truss addresses the Conservative Political Action Conference in the United States, where she said Western civilisation is at risk if Conservatives do not develop a louder voice, and attributes the downfall of her administration to "antagonism" from the establishment. She subsequently appears on a podcast with former Trump strategist Steve Bannon, where she remains silent as Bannon describes the far-right political activist Tommy Robinson as a "hero".
- 23 February –
  - A UK government commissioned report prepared by Lord Walney recommends giving police extra powers to tackle protests outside Parliament in order to protect politicians against "intimidation" that could influence the way they vote.
  - Sammy Wilson announces his resignation as DUP Chief Whip at Westminster.
  - The UK agrees a deal with the European Border and Coast Guard Agency (Frontex) to work more closely to prevent migrants crossing the English Channel in small boats.
  - Bob Stewart, MP for Beckenham, has his conviction for a racially aggravated public order offence quashed following an appeal.
- 24 February – Lee Anderson is suspended from the Conservative Party after "refusing to apologise" for saying "Islamists" had "got control" of London Mayor Sadiq Khan during an edition of his GB News show the previous day.
- 25 February –
  - Sunak warns of the dangers of polarisation and hatred in politics following a week of political friction at Westminster.
  - Preet Gill, Labour MP for Birmingham Edgbaston, tells BBC Politics Midlands that receiving death threats appears to have become the "norm" and that her job worries her "in a way I've never been worried before".
  - The SNP announces plans to apply for another parliamentary debate on Gaza in the coming week.
  - The Scottish Government confirms that Economy Secretary Màiri McAllan, who is pregnant, will take maternity leave during the summer, becoming the second Scottish Government minister to do so.
- 26 February –
  - House of Commons Speaker Sir Lindsay Hoyle rejects the SNP's request for an emergency debate on Gaza.
  - Lee Anderson says that his words were clumsy, but refuses to apologise for his comments about Sadiq Khan.
- 27 February –
  - A statement from 10 Downing Street says that the prime minister believed Lee Anderson's comments were wrong because they conflated "all Muslims with Islamist extremism".
  - Conservative MP and former minister Paul Scully apologises for suggesting there are "no-go" areas in parts of the London Borough of Tower Hamlets.
  - MSPs vote 68–55 in favour of the 2024 Scottish budget, which includes a council tax freeze and 45% and 48% income tax rates for higher earners.
  - Fergus Ewing loses his appeal against a week-long suspension from the SNP group at Holyrood in September 2023 after he criticised the party leadership.
  - MPs vote to suspend Scott Benton from Parliament for 35 days, triggering a recall petition.
- 28 February –
  - The UK government announces a £31m financial package to improve MPs security.
  - Pro-Palestinian groups say they will continue to march after Home Secretary James Cleverly questioned whether holding regular marches "adds value" to calls for a ceasefire in Gaza during an interview with The Times.
  - The High Court in Belfast rules that conditional immunity from prosecutions for Troubles-era crimes, contained in the Northern Ireland Troubles (Legacy and Reconciliation) Act 2023, is in breach of the European Convention on Human Rights.
  - Addressing a meeting of police leaders, Sunak warns of a "growing consensus that mob rule is replacing democratic rule" and says that "a pattern of increasingly violent and intimidatory [sic] behaviour" cannot be allowed to stop elected representatives doing their job.
- 29 February –
  - 2024 Rochdale by-election: In an unusually chaotic by-election, George Galloway wins for the Workers Party of Britain, marking his return to parliament. Independent candidate David Tully comes second, with the Conservative candidate Paul Ellison coming third. Both the Labour and Green Party candidates were disowned by their respective parties.
  - Michael Gove is placed under investigation by the Parliamentary Commissioner for Standards, in relation to his register of financial interests.
  - MP Julian Knight is told by Essex Police he will face no criminal charges following an investigation into allegations of serious sexual assault that were made against him.
  - Figures published by the Home Office show a reduction in the backlog of asylum applications, driven by an increase in decisions, with 74,172 initial decisions on asylum applications made during 2023, an almost fourfold increase on the 2022 figure.

=== March ===
- 1 March –
  - 2024 Rochdale by-election:
    - Sir Keir Starmer apologises to the voters of Rochdale for disowning the Labour Party's candidate, but says it was "the right decision".
    - In a statement outside 10 Downing Street, Sunak warns that Islamists and far-right extremists, which he describes as "two sides of the same extremist coin", are trying to "deliberately" undermine the UK's "multi-faith democracy", and says the UK must face them down.
  - Figures from the National Audit Office show the UK government will pay Rwanda a total of £350m for the agreement to take asylum seekers, with £150,000 also being paid to Rwanda for each person sent there.
  - Conservative peer Lord Bamford, chairman of JCB, retires from the House of Lords.
- 2–3 March – The London Labour conference is held at the Leonardo Royal Hotel in Tower Bridge.
- 4 March –
  - Sunak says the UK economy is "getting on the right track" ahead of what is expected to be the last budget before the next election.
  - George Galloway is sworn in as an MP at Westminster.
  - Paul Scully, MP for Sutton and Cheam, announces he is standing down from Parliament at the next general election.
  - Lee Waters announces he is stepping down as Wales's Transport Minister when the new First Minister of Wales is elected.
- 5 March – A bid by the Welsh Conservatives and Welsh Liberal Democrats to change planned reforms to the way Senedd members are elected from the 2026 election is rejected by the parliament.
- 6 March –
  - Chancellor Jeremy Hunt delivers the 2024 United Kingdom budget.
  - Information published by the Department for Science, Innovation and Technology reveals that £15,000 in damages was paid to academic Kate Sand after Science Minister Michelle Donelan described her as a Hamas supporter in 2023; Donelan retracted the allegations on 5 March.
  - University Challenge contestant Melika Gorgianeh accepts substantial damages from Conservative peer Jacqueline Foster after Foster accused her of being antisemitic following her appearance on the quiz show in November 2023.
  - Senedd member Rhys ab Owen is to be banned from the Senedd for six weeks after an investigation by the Senedd Commission found he inappropriately touched two women during a night out in June 2021.
- 7 March – Blur drummer Dave Rowntree is selected as the Labour Party candidate for Mid Sussex.
- 8 March –
  - Former prime minister Theresa May announces she is stepping down from Parliament at the next general election.
  - Brenda Dacres is elected Mayor of Lewisham becoming the first black woman directly elected mayor in England.
  - Robin Simcox, the UK government's Commissioner for Countering Extremism, warns that London has become a "no-go zone for Jews" at weekends because of pro-Palestinian protests.
- 9 March –
  - In an article posted on LinkedIn, senior UK government ministers Anne-Marie Trevelyan and Tom Tugendhat urge Sunak to increase defence spending to above 2.5% of GDP, arguing that the UK needs to "lead the way" on defence spending and invest at a "much greater pace".
  - A Daily Telegraph report alleging a conflict-of-interest involving First Minister of Scotland Humza Yousaf after the Scottish Government donated £250,000 to the UN agency UNRWA, which supports Palestinian refugees, is rejected by Yousaf as an "outrageous smear" and a "far right conspiracy".
- 10 March – BBC News reports that former prime minister Boris Johnson flew to Venezuela during February for an unofficial private meeting with President Nicolás Maduro.
- 11 March –
  - Ashfield MP Lee Anderson defects from the Conservatives to Reform UK, becoming the party's first sitting Member of Parliament.
  - Addressing the Institute for Government, former prime minister Sir John Major criticises his recent Conservative successors for the attitude towards the civil service, and describes the quick succession of prime ministers in recent years as "not conducive to good government".
  - As the UK government prepares to redraw the definition of extremism, former Home Secretaries Priti Patel, Sajid Javid and Amber Rudd warn against attempting to politicise extremism at the next election.
  - After the Welsh Government publishes plans to require parties in the Senedd to draw up lists of candidates composing of 50% of women, presiding officer Elin Jones says that the Senedd does not have the power to enforce gender quotas.
  - Conservative Party donor Frank Hester apologises after The Guardian reported comments he is alleged to have made in 2019 about Labour MP Diane Abbott, when he is said to have suggested she made him "want to hate all black women" and that she "should be shot".
  - David Neal, the former Independent Chief Inspector of Borders and Immigration, has described the Home Office is dysfunctional and in urgent need of reform, citing problems with immigration as an example.
- 12 March –
  - A spokesman for the prime minister describes the remarks allegedly made by Frank Hester about Diane Abbott as "racist and wrong".
  - A recall petition opens in the Blackpool South constituency following Scott Benton's 35 day suspension from Parliament.
- 13 March –
  - Sunak tells Prime Minister's Questions he will not return £10m donated to the Conservative Party by Frank Hester, because he has apologised and "his remorse should be accepted".
  - The UK government announces a scheme to offer failed asylum seekers £3,000 if they agree to move to Rwanda voluntarily.
  - The UK government announces a ban on foreign state ownership of British newspapers and news magazines following controversy over a potential purchase of The Telegraph by a consortium backed by the United Arab Emirates.
  - Middlesbrough MP Andy McDonald regains the Labour whip.
- 14 March –
  - Russia is reported to have jammed the GPS signal of an RAF plane carrying Defence Secretary Grant Shapps back to the UK from Poland the previous day for around 30 minutes as the plane flew near the border of the Russian territory of Kaliningrad.
  - Speaking in the House of Commons, Secretary of State for Levelling Up, Housing and Communities Michael Gove outlines the UK government's new definition of extremism, and names five groups that would be assessed against the new criteria. They are the British National Socialist Movement, Patriotic Alternative, the Muslim Association of Britain, CAGE and Muslim Engagement and Development. The new definition is criticised by civil liberties and community groups, while most of the groups named by Gove threaten legal action if they are added to the list.
  - Speaking to ITV News West Country, Sunak rules out 2 May as the date of the next general election.
  - The news website Tortoise Media reports that the Conservatives have received a further £5m in donations from Frank Hester that are yet to be declared.
  - Sir Brandon Lewis, a former Conservative Party Chairman, announces he is standing down from Parliament at the next general election.
  - The Independent Parliamentary Standards Authority confirms that MPs annual salaries will increase by 5% to £91,346 from April.
  - Government papers show that former prime minister Liz Truss accepted a £20,000 trip to the United States in February paid for by the Green Dragon Coalition, an obscure group that takes its name from the Green Dragon Tavern in Boston, Massachusetts, and is believed to support US Presidential candidate Donald Trump. The trip was to attend a three-day conference at a hotel on Sea Island, Georgia.
  - The Scottish Parliament Corporate Body finds Michael Matheson in breach of the Ministerial Code over his £1,000 iPad bill.
  - Former Conservative MP Guto Bebb is appointed interim chair of S4C.
- 15 March –
  - Armed Forces Minister James Heappey, MP for Wells, announces he will not stand at the next general election.
  - A report by the Public Accounts Committee finds that only 10% of the money promised to reduce inequality under the Levelling Up scheme had actually been spent.
  - The Animal Welfare (Import of Dogs, Cats and Ferrets) Bill, introduced as a private member's bill, passes its first reading in the House of Commons after securing the backing of the UK government. The bill aims to ban the import of puppies, kittens and ferrets under the age of six months into the UK.
  - Apple agrees to pay a £385m settlement on a lawsuit led by Norfolk County Council, which was started over allegations Apple CEO Tim Cook defrauded shareholders in a pension company administered by the Council by covering up lower demand for iPhones in China.
- 16 March –
  - Vaughan Gething is elected to lead Welsh Labour, and will become First Minister of Wales. He will be Wales's first black leader, and the first black person to lead a country in Europe. With Gething's win it means that three of the four governments in the UK will have non-white leaders.
  - A group calling itself the South Devon Primary, which aims to unseat Conservative MPs in South Devon at the next election, chooses Liberal Democrat Caroline Voaden as a candidate for one of its constituencies.
  - Traditional Unionist Voice leader Jim Allister announces a formal "partnership" with Reform UK at the next general election.
- 17 March –
  - Transport Secretary Mark Harper tells the BBC that the Conservative Party welcomes members "whatever their race".
  - Pete Wishart, the SNP's longest-serving MP at Westminster, distances himself from the party's election message of making Scotland "Tory-free", describing it as unhelpful.
- 18 March –
  - Amendments to the Safety of Rwanda (Asylum and Immigration) Bill tabled in the House of Lords are overturned again in the House of Commons. The changes included allowing courts to question Rwanda's safety as a country.
  - Former US president Barack Obama arrives at 10 Downing Street for talks with Sunak.
  - Ofcom finds that five episodes of GB News shows presented by Jacob Rees Mogg, Esther McVey and Phillip Davies broke their rules, and warns the channel about its use of Conservative MPs to host news content.
  - Business Secretary Kemi Badenoch dismisses rumours of a plot to unseat Sunak as Conservative leader as the party continues to fair badly in the polls.
- 19 March –
  - While speaking to a House of Lords Committee, Chancellor Jeremy Hunt hints that the next general election may take place in October.
  - Labour's Clive Lewis, MP for Norwich South, apologises for swearing in Parliament after he was overheard to use the word "shit" while voting on the government's Rwanda legislation the previous evening.
  - The Football Governance Bill, which aims to establish an independent football regulator for England, is introduced into Parliament.
  - Mark Drakeford attends his final First Minister's Questions as First Minister of Wales.
- 20 March –
  - The Tobacco and Vapes Bill, which would make it illegal for anyone born after 2009 to purchase cigarettes by raising the minimum age by a year starting in 2027, begins its process through Parliament.
  - The Senedd approves Vaughan Gething as the next First Minister of Wales.
- 21 March –
  - Carmen Smith is sworn in as the youngest member of the House of Lords.
  - The Scottish Parliamentary Corporate Body confirms that members of Scottish Parliament staff will no longer be allowed to wear rainbow lanyards, or any other badge or jewellery associated with social issues, while at Holyrood.
  - The Wildlife Management and Muirburn (Scotland) Bill passes its final vote in the Scottish Parliament. Among measures it introduces is a licensing scheme for land where grouse shooting takes place, and regulations for traps.
  - Vaughan Gething announces his cabinet. Appointments include Jeremy Miles, who becomes Economy and Environment Minister and Lynne Neagle, who becomes Education Minister.
  - Dan Barker, selected in December 2023 as the Conservative candidate for the 2024 Greater Manchester mayoral election, defects to Reform UK, accusing the Conservatives of giving up on the north of England.
  - BBC News reports that officials have raised concerns about the role of secretary of state for the environment Steve Barclay in a proposed waste incinerator in his constituency, which he opposes, and he will consequently no longer have a role in the decision-making process.
- 22 March –
  - West Yorkshire Police launches an investigation into the alleged comments made about Diane Abbott by Conservative Party donor Frank Hester.
  - A private member's bill introduced to Parliament by Conservative MP Gareth Johnson that aimed to prevent the expansion of London's Ultra Low Emission Zone runs out of Parliamentary time.
  - Penny Mordaunt dismisses rumours of a potential leadership challenge against Rishi Sunak as "nonsense".
  - MPs in the House of Commons give their backing to a private member's bill that will ban the import of hunting trophies into the UK if it becomes law.
- 24 March – Chancellor Jeremy Hunt says the Conservatives will keep the triple lock mechanism for deciding the rise in the state pension if they win the next election.
- 25 March –
  - Former Conservative MP Scott Benton resigns his Parliamentary seat, triggering a by-election in the Blackpool South constituency.
  - The UK formally accuses China of being behind a "malicious" cyberattack against MPs and the Electoral Commission.
- 26 March –
  - Education Minister Robert Halfon and Armed Forces Minister James Heappey announce their resignations from the Sunak ministry, having decided to stand down from Parliament at the next election.
  - BBC News reports that HM Treasury sent members of staff to work at Asian Infrastructure Investment Bank, which is accused of being "dominated" by the Chinese Communist Party.
  - The first meeting of the East–West Council, established as part of the restoration of government in Northern Ireland, is held in London.
- 27 March – A report clears Conservative MP Bernard Jenkin of breaching COVID-19 laws over his attendance at a "wine and nibbles" event on the Parliamentary estate in December 2020, which the report describes as socially-distanced with "business and social elements".
- 28 March –
  - Keir Starmer and Angela Rayner launch Labour's campaign for the 2024 United Kingdom local elections at an event in Dudley.
  - Honours are conferred on businessman and senior Conservative Party treasurer Mohamed Mansour, Farming Minister Mark Spencer and Shipley MP Philip Davies, all of who receive knighthoods, while former ministers Tracey Crouch and Harriett Baldwin are awarded damehoods. The announcement comes as part of an honours list published at the start of the Parliamentary recess.
  - The Assisted Dying for Terminally Ill Adults (Scotland) Bill, a bill to legalise assisted dying in Scotland and drafted by Liberal Democrat MSP Liam McArthur, is introduced into the Scottish Parliament.
- 29 March – Sir Jeffrey Donaldson resigns as leader of the Democratic Unionist Party after being charged with rape and other historical sexual offences. Gavin Robinson is appointed interim leader until a new leader can be elected.
- 30 March – First Minister of Northern Ireland Michelle O'Neill says she is determined the Stormont Assembly and Executive will continue to function following the resignation of Jeffrey Donaldson as DUP leader.
- 31 March –
  - The UK government says it will work alongside the Northern Ireland Executive to maintain stability at Stormont.
  - A Survation poll of 15,000 people suggests the Conservatives could win fewer than 100 seats at the next election, forecasting Labour with 468 seats, the Conservatives with 98 seats, the Scottish National Party with 41 seats and the Liberal Democrats with 22 seats.

=== April ===
- 1 April –
  - The Hate Crime and Public Order (Scotland) Act 2021, which creates a new crime of "stirring up hatred" relating to age, disability, religion, sexual orientation, transgender identity or being intersex, comes into force in Scotland.
  - Twenty Labour Party councillors serving on Pendle Borough Council, Nelson Town Council and Brierfield Town Council resign from the party in protest at Sir Keir Starmer's leadership, which they say no longer reflects their views. This included the leader of Pendle Borough Council Asjad Mahmood.
- 2 April – Education Secretary Gillian Keegan says that proposed homelessness legislation will not be used against "excessive smells". The Criminal Justice Bill, which is currently making its way through Parliament, will replace the 1824 Vagrancy Act.
- 3 April –
  - Labour commits to the Conservatives' childcare expansion plans if it wins the next general election.
  - MP Johnny Mercer announces his intention to challenge a court order to reveal names of those who had told him about alleged war crimes by British special forces in Afghanistan.
- 4 April – Conservative MP William Wragg tells The Times he shared the phone numbers of fellow MPs with someone he met on a dating app after sending the person intimate pictures of himself.
- 5 April –
  - Veterans' Minister Johnny Mercer is given until 8 May to present his argument as to why he should not reveal the identity of those who told him about alleged war crimes committed in Afghanistan by British Special Forces.
  - The Conservative Party launches an investigation into former Foreign Office minister Alan Duncan after an appearance on LBC during which he said the Conservative Friends of Israel was "doing the bidding" of Israeli prime minister Benjamin Netanyahu.
  - Conservative MP Luke Evans identifies himself to police as "a victim of cyber-flashing and malicious communication".
- 8 April –
  - Ofcom launches an investigation into the 29 March edition of David Lammy's show on LBC to determine whether it broke the rules regarding politicians acting as newsreaders.
  - William Wragg steps down as vice chair of the Conservative Party's 1922 Committee following revelations about the Westminster WhatsApp scam.
  - Richard Tice, leader of Reform UK, defends his party's vetting procedure after 12 general election candidates were deselected for offensive social media posts.
- 9 April –
  - William Wragg voluntarily resigns the Conservative whip and will sit in Parliament as an independent MP. He also gives up his role on the Public Administration Committee.
  - The brother-in-law of First Minister of Scotland Humza Yousaf appeared at Dundee Sheriff Court charged with abduction and extortion following an incident where a man fell from a block of flats and later died.
  - Three people are arrested after staging a protest outside the London home of Keir Starmer.
- 10 April –
  - Figures published by the Foreign Office indicate that £4.3bn of its budget for 2023 – roughly a quarter of the overall foreign aid budget for the year – was spent on refugees and asylum seekers in the UK.
  - Scottish Labour suspends Wilma Brown, its parliamentary candidate for Cowdenbeath and Kirkcaldy, following reports she liked racist and Islamophobic posts on social media.
- 11 April –
  - The Department for Science, Innovation and Technology says that the legal fees for Michelle Donelan came to over £19,000.
  - Sally Bunce, the Green Party candidate for Mayor of the Tees Valley in the May election, drops out of the contest saying she does not want to split the vote against the Conservative candidate.
  - Reform UK apologise to the family of their dropped candidate for York Central Tommy Cawkwell for "inactivity" not knowing that he had died.
  - Joe Haines and Lord Donoughue, who were two of Harold Wilson's advisers during his time as prime minister, tell The Times that Wilson had an affair with his deputy press secretary, Janet Hewlett-Davies, during the 1970s.
  - Mid and East Antrim Borough Council is refused permission to rename its town hall complex after the late Queen Elizabeth II.
- 12 April –
  - Greater Manchester Police launch an investigation into Labour's deputy leader, Angela Rayner, over the sale of her council house amid allegations she broke electoral law by giving false information about her place of residence. Rayner pledges to step down if she is found guilty of any crime.
  - Keir Starmer says that if elected to government, Labour will raise defence spending to 2.5% of GDP. He also makes an "unshakable" commitment to nuclear weapons.
  - Graham Stuart, MP for Beverley and Holderness, resigns from his ministerial post of Energy Minister with the UK government to spend more time focusing on local issues. He is replaced by Justin Tomlinson.
  - Bambos Charalambous, MP for Enfield Southgate, is readmitted to the Labour Party following a ten month long internal investigation.
- 13 April –
  - Tim Loughton, MP for East Worthing and Shoreham since 1997, announces he will stand down from parliament at the next election. He becomes the 100th MP to announce they will not seek re-election at the next election.
  - An OpenDemocracy investigation reveals high level Labour politicians met with financial services firms following a £150,000 donation to the party from one of the companies.
  - Simon Geraghty, the former leader of Worcester City Council, announces he will stand down at the May election after 24 years.
  - Leader of Norfolk County Council Kay Mason Billig says that Natural England is blocking the proposed Norwich Northern Distributor Road scheme by protecting a bat colony.
  - Mayor of London Sadiq Khan launches what he describes as a "new climate action plan" for London, which includes a Net Zero Schools target and recommitting to making London Net Zero by 2030.
- 14 April – Some Conservative MPs and businesspeople are proposing to boycott Downing Street's Eid celebration, scheduled for the following day, because of the UK government's support for Israel.
- 15 April –
  - Peers living outside London become eligible to claim £100 for accommodation expenses when they attend sittings at the House of Lords.
  - Sunak is absent from the Downing Street Eid celebration.
  - Former prime minister Liz Truss endorses Donald Trump to win the 2024 United States presidential election.
- 16 April –
  - The Tobacco and Vapes Bill passes by 383 votes to 67, banning anyone born after 2009 from legally buying cigarettes in the UK.
  - The House of Lords reinstates proposed changes to the UK government's Rwanda legislation.
  - An amendment to the Criminal Justice Bill will make the creation of sexually explicit deepfake images a specific criminal offence in England and Wales if the images are created without the permission of the person.
- 17 April –
  - David Cameron visits Benjamin Netanyahu in Jerusalem.
  - MPs overturn amendments to the UK government's Rwanda legislation made by the House of Lords only for them to be reinstated when the legislation is sent back to the Upper House for consideration.
  - The Equality and Human Rights Commission warns that plans to enforce gender equality in the Senedd may be unlawful because it may breach the Equality Act if candidates can self-identify as female when that is not their legal sex.
  - Leader of Devon County Council John Hart announces his resignation after 15 years in office.
  - Nigel Farage and Suella Braverman attend the National Conservatism Conference in Brussels.
- 18 April –
  - Peter Murrell, the former chief executive of the Scottish National Party (SNP) and husband of Nicola Sturgeon, is re-arrested by Police Scotland and charged in connection with the embezzlement of funds from the SNP. Murrell also resigns his membership of the SNP.
  - Mark Menzies MP resigns the Conservative whip. This as due to an ongoing internal investigation into his conduct.
  - Jonathan Nunn, leader of West Northamptonshire Council, is accused of misconduct by five women.
- 19 April –
  - In a speech on welfare, Prime Minister Rishi Sunak sets out plans to tackle what he describes as the UK's "sick note culture" by stripping GPs in England of their authority to sign people off work.
  - Labour sets out plans to build more housing, with priority given to brownfield sites and poor quality greenbelt land dubbed "greybelt" land.
  - It is announced that Scottish Green Party members will have a vote on the Bute House Agreement following the SNP ditching climate targets.
  - Labour writes to Lancashire Police regarding allegations made against Mark Menzies. A review of information relating to the allegations is subsequently commenced.
  - The Scottish Greens announce their intention to hold a vote on whether to stay in government with the Scottish National Party following the SNP's decision to scrap key climate targets.
  - Biteback Publishing apologises over a false quote linked to an antisemitic conspiracy theory in Liz Truss's memoir, Ten Years to Save the West, and says it will be removed from future copies of the book.
  - The Advisory Committee on Business Appointments rules that Boris Johnson broke government rules by being "evasive" about a meeting with Venezuelan president Nicolás Maduro.
- 20 April – BBC News reports that the SNP will form a minority government if the Scottish Greens vote to end their power-sharing agreement.
- 21 April –
  - Mark Menzies quits the Conservative Party and says he will stand down from Parliament at the next election.
  - Robin Swann, who is the perspective Ulster Unionist candidate for South Antrim, announces he will step down from his post as Northern Ireland's Health Minister once the general election campaign begins.
- 22 April –
  - Parliament passes the Safety of Rwanda Bill, with plans to deport the first asylum seekers to Kigali in July.
  - Two men, including a parliamentary researcher, are charged with spying for China after providing information that could be "useful to an enemy".
  - Conservative councillor Richard Solesbury-Timms, who represents Middleton Cheney on West Northamptonshire Council, leaves the party to sit as an independent citing the party's dealing with allegations against the council leader.
- 23 April –
  - Patrick Harvie says he will resign as co-leader of the Scottish Greens if the party votes to end its coalition agreement with the SNP.
  - Alliance Party MLA Patrick Brown resigns his South Down seat in the Northern Ireland Assembly, citing personal reasons for doing so.
- 24 April –
  - Rishi Sunak vows to increase UK defence spending to 2.5% of GDP by 2030.
  - Labour unveils its plans for improvements to train services, which include automatic refunds for delays, a "best price" guarantee and improved internet coverage.
  - Jeffrey Donaldson appears at Newry Magistrates' Court to face charges of historic child abuse.
  - Johnny Timpson, the UK's inaugural disability ambassador, resigns over the UK government's policy of clawing back benefit overpayment.
- 25 April –
  - Bute House Agreement:
    - Scotland's SNP–Green power sharing agreement is formally dissolved, meaning Humza Yousaf now leads a minority government.
    - The Scottish Conservatives table a vote of no confidence in Yousaf, which is scheduled for the following week.
  - Labour pledge to renationalise most rail services within five years if they win the next general election.
  - At the High Court, leader of the Reclaim Party Laurence Fox is ordered to pay £180,000 in libel damages to former Stonewall trustee Simon Blake and drag artist Crystal.
  - Home Secretary James Cleverly says he opposes attempts to reduce the time limit for abortion.
- 26 April –
  - Humza Yousaf says he will not resign as first minister of Scotland despite facing a motion of no confidence in his government.
  - Sadiq Khan apologises to the Chief Rabbi over comments he made during a discussion about Islamophobia.
- 27 April –
  - Dan Poulter, MP for Central Suffolk and North Ipswich defects from Conservative to the Labour Party, citing the NHS crisis as his reason for doing so.
  - TUV leader Jim Allister, whose party agreed a formal partnership with Reform UK for the upcoming general election, distances himself from remarks in which Reform's deputy leader, Ben Habib, suggested some migrants travelling to the UK in small boats should be left to drown.
- 28 April –
  - BBC News reports that Yousaf had ruled out an electoral pact between the SNP and Alba Party after Alex Salmond suggested the party would support him in a vote of no confidence in the Scottish Parliament.
  - Sunak refuses to rule out a general election in July following speculation of a summer election.
- 29 April –
  - 2024 Scottish government crisis: First Minister, Humza Yousaf, announces he will resign as both leader of the SNP and first minister of Scotland when his successor is chosen.
  - The UK government launches a 12 week consultation process on changes to Personal Independence Payment benefits.
  - MPs debates assisted dying after a petition started by Dame Esther Rantzen was signed by 200,000 people, triggering a parliamentary debate.
  - SDLP Councillor Lilian Seenoi-Barr is set to become Northern Ireland's first black mayor after being selected as the next first citizen of Derry City and Strabane District Council.
- 30 April –
  - Officials at Holyrood confirm that Labour's motion of no confidence in the Scottish Government will be voted on by MSPs the next day.
  - Former England cricketer Monty Panesar is announced as the Workers Party of Britain candidate for Ealing Southall.

=== May ===
- 1 May –
  - The FDA trade union announces plans to mount a legal challenge against the UK government's Safety of Rwanda Act amid concerns it breaches international law.
  - MSPs vote 70–58 to defeat a motion of no confidence in the Scottish Government.
- 2 May –
  - Local elections take place for councils and mayors in England and police and crime commissioners in England and Wales. The 2024 Blackpool South by-election is also held on the same day.
  - John Swinney is set to become the next SNP leader and first minister after Kate Forbes confirms she will not seek the party's leadership.
- 3 May –
  - With 90% of council election results announced, the Conservatives have lost over 400 council seats, while Labour regains control of Hartlepool, Redditch, Rushmoor and Thurrock Councils.
  - Ben Houchen wins the Tees Valley mayoral election, retaining the seat for the Conservatives, while Labour win mayoral elections in the East Midlands, North East and York and North Yorkshire.
  - Chris Webb wins the 2024 Blackpool South by-election, with a 26% swing to Labour.
  - 2024 Peterborough City Council election: At 18, Daisy Creedon-Blakemore becomes the UK's youngest councillor after winning a seat for Labour in Peterborough City Council's Fletton and Woodston ward.
- 4 May
  - 2024 London mayoral election: Labour's Sadiq Khan secures a third term as Mayor of London with 44% of the vote, beating the Conservative Susan Hall on 33%.
  - 2024 West Midlands mayoral election: Labour's Richard Parker narrowly defeats the Conservative incumbent Andy Street to become Mayor of the West Midlands.
  - 2024 Greater Manchester mayoral election: Labour's Andy Burnham secures a third term as Mayor of Greater Manchester with almost two-thirds of the votes cast.
  - The SDLP announces that it will change the way it makes "civil leadership" appointments following the resignation from the party of two Derry City and Strabane District Council councillors over the appointment of Lilian Seenoi-Barr as the authority's next mayor.
- 5 May – With all votes counted, the results from the local elections in England are: Labour 1,158 (+186), Liberal Democrat 522 (+104), Conservative 515 (−474), Independents and others 228 (+93), Green 181 (+74), Residents' Association 48 (+11), Workers Party of Britain 4 (+4), Reform UK 2 (+2).
- 6 May –
  - Argentina's president, Javier Milei, tells the BBC he accepts the Falkland Islands are currently "in the hands of the UK", but says his country will get them back through diplomatic channels.
  - John Swinney is confirmed as Leader of the Scottish National Party after being unopposed in the leadership election, and begins his second tenure in the post.
- 7 May –
  - John Swinney wins the backing of the Scottish Parliament to become Scotland's seventh First Minister, and will be sworn into office the next day.
  - The Green Party's Siân Berry, who was re-elected in the 2024 London Assembly election, is criticised for resigning three days later to hand her seat to Zoë Garbett, who lost in the same election with 5.8% of the vote. Berry steps down from the post in order to run as Green candidate in Brighton Pavilion, where current MP Caroline Lucas is standing down at the next election.
- 8 May –
  - John Swinney is sworn in as Scotland's seventh first minister at a ceremony at the Court of Session in Edinburgh.
  - Swinney appoints Kate Forbes as Scotland's Deputy First Minister.
  - The Conservative Member of Parliament for Dover Natalie Elphicke defects to the Labour Party.
  - The Labour whip is restored to Kate Osamor.
  - Former England cricketer Monty Panesar quits the Workers Party of Britain a week after being unveiled as one of its general election candidates.
  - MSs vote 43–16 to approve the Senedd Reform Bill that will see the number of members increase from 60 to 96 at the next election.
- 9 May –
  - Former cabinet minister Nadhim Zahawi says he will stand down from Parliament at the next election.
  - Natalie Elphicke apologises for past comments in support of her ex-husband, Charlie, which she made when he was convicted of sexual assault.
  - Swinney confirms to the BBC that the SNP's strategy of using the next general election as a mandate for a second referendum on Scottish independence remains.
  - The government announces that a ban on sex offenders in England and Wales changing their name to avoid detection will be brought in.
- 10 May – The Scottish Government reaffirms its wish to see the Gender Recognition Reform (Scotland) Bill enacted.
- 11 May – The Independent Press Standards Organisation rejects a complaint by former MP Scott Benton that an article published by The Times in April 2023 was in breach of IPSO's editors code.
- 12 May –
  - Foreign Secretary David Cameron tells the BBC's Sunday with Laura Kuenssberg that a ban on the sale of UK weapons to Israel would only strengthen Hamas.
  - Former Chancellor Nadhim Zahawi tells BBC News he has paid nearly £5m to authorities to settle his tax affairs.
- 13 May –
  - The House of Commons approves plans to exclude MPs from the parliamentary estate if they have been arrested on suspicion of a serious offence.
  - Health secretary Victoria Atkins says that more maternity care scandals are likely following a birth trauma report on maternity care services.
  - Labour MP Rosie Duffield calls for the party to suspend Natalie Elphicke while investigating lobbying allegations.
  - Labour MP Chris Bryant reveals he has skin cancer.
  - A judge at the Northern Ireland High Court rules that the UK government's Illegal Migration Act should not apply in Northern Ireland because of human rights laws and the Windsor Framework.
  - The UK government scraps a planned amendment to the Criminal Justice Bill that would give police the power to move homeless people on because of "smells" following opposition from Conservative MPs.
- 14 May –
  - MSPs unanimously approve the Housing Cladding Remediation Bill with 116 votes in favour of the legislation that seeks to address problems with cladding on buildings and avoid a similar incident to the Grenfell Tower fire in Scotland.
  - Defence Secretary Grant Shapps says six new warships will help fight the "conflicts of the future".
- 15 May –
  - Rishi Sunak is challenged in PMQs over the early release of dangerous criminals.
  - David Lammy and John Healey visit Ukraine and confirm Labour support.
  - Sir Robert Buckland denies that he concealed lobbying efforts of Natalie Elphicke.
  - Baroness Smith of Basildon says that hereditary peers will be phased out by any new Labour government.
  - Former British Liberal Democrat MEP Graham Watson announces he will be a candidate in the 2024 European Parliament election in Italy.
  - The UK government agrees to make death by dangerous cycling a criminal offence punishable by up to 14 years in prison after a campaign by Sir Iain Duncan Smith, who proposed the measures as an amendment to the Criminal Justice Bill, and after MPs vote in favour of the amendment.
  - The Rwanda Asylum Plan is expanded to include all failed asylum seekers rather than the original plan of those arriving in the UK after 1 January 2022.
- 16 May –
  - The UK government announces plans to allow the use of debit cards in pub slot machines, which it argues will allow pubs, casinos and gambling venues to compete in an increasingly cashless society.
  - The Green Party of England and Wales says it will take action against candidates who make or support antisemitic remarks following complaints.
  - The Independent Parliamentary Standards Authority finds that Paul Maynard, MP for Blackpool North and Cleveleys, broke expenses rules by using public resources to produce "overtly political" material for the Conservative Party.
- 17 May –
  - Plaid Cymru ends its co-operation deal with Labour in Wales following concerns about a donation of £200,000 to First Minister Vaughan Gething's leadership campaign by a company owned by a businessman twice convicted of environmental offences.
  - South Wales Police and the Senedd Commission for Standards launch investigations into allegations that Conservative MS Laura Anne Jones made false expenses claims.
- 18 May – Chris Heaton-Harris, the secretary of state for Northern Ireland, confirms he will be standing down from Parliament at the next general election.
- 20 May –
  - Ofcom says it is considering imposing a statutory sanction against GB News after concluding its programme People's Forum: The Prime Minister, a Q&A session with prime minister Rishi Sunak that aired in February, broke impartiality rules.
  - The Stormont Assembly endorses a Legislative Consent Motion to extend the Pet Abduction Bill, introduced at Westminster, to Northern Ireland, making the abduction of cats and dogs a criminal offence.
- 21 May –
  - The High Court rules that UK government plans to extend police powers over protests are unlawful.
  - Stormont votes in favour of adopting Westminster's Tobacco and Vapes Bill that will gradually phase in a smoking ban from 2027.
- 22 May –
  - Rishi Sunak announces that a general election will be held on 4 July.
  - Craig Mackinlay, MP for Thanet South, returns to the House of Commons following a long absence after contracting sepsis, an illness that required him to undergo a quadruple amputation, and receives a rare standing ovation from colleagues.
- 23 May –
  - Sunak confirms that no asylum seekers will be sent to Rwanda before the general election under UK government deportation plans.
  - Nigel Farage, founder of Reform UK, confirms he will not stand as a candidate in the upcoming general election.
  - Police Scotland announces that it has submitted a "standard prosecution report" concerning its investigation into SNP finances to the Crown Office and Procurator Fiscal Service.
  - First Minister of Scotland John Swinney announces he will not accept a parliamentary committee ruling to exclude Michael Matheson from Holyrood for 27 days over his £11,000 iPad charges bill, saying the decision is "prejudiced" due to the involvement of a Conservative MSP who previously made comments about Matheson.
- 24 May –
  - Sir John Redwood, MP for Wokingham, announces he will not contest the next election.
  - Former Education Secretary Michael Gove announces he will not stand for parliament again at the next election.
  - Junior health minister Andrea Leadsom announces she will not contest the next election.
  - Craig Mackinlay decides he will not contest the new parliamentary seat of Thanet East after what he describes as "36 hours of intense soul searching" following the announcement of the election and his feeling that the work schedule would be too much to deal with while he continues to recover from sepsis.
  - Greg Clark, MP for Tunbridge Wells, announces he will not contest the next general election.
  - Jeremy Corbyn is ejected from the Labour Party after announcing he will stand as an independent candidate in the Islington North constituency, which he has represented since 1983.
  - Parliament is prorogued ahead of the general election.
  - The Tobacco and Vapes Bill is not among legislation to be rushed through Parliament before its prorogation. The Renters (Reform) Bill, which would have brought in an end to no-fault evictions, is also shelved. But the Post Office (Horizon System) Offences Bill, which quashes the convictions of sub-postmasters convicted in the Horizon scandal in England, Wales and Northern Ireland is passed, as is the Pet Abduction Bill, making the abduction of cats and dogs a criminal offence from August. The Victims and Prisoners Bill is also passed into law.
  - The Media Act 2024 receives Royal assent following its approval by Parliament the previous day.
  - Jonathan Buckley is selected as the Democratic Unionist Party candidate for Lagan Valley following the departure of Sir Jeffrey Donaldson.
- 27 May –
  - Outgoing MP Lucy Allan endorses Reform UK and is suspended from the Conservative Party.
  - Barbara Keeley, MP for Worsley and Eccles South, announces her retirement from Parliament.
  - John Spellar, MP for Warley, announces his retirement from Parliament.
  - Kevin Brennan, MP for Cardiff West, announces he is standing down from Parliament at the election.
- 28 May –
  - The Times publishes a letter signed by 121 prominent business figures endorsing the Labour Party.
  - Diane Abbott has the Labour Party whip restored following its suspension in April 2023.
  - Greater Manchester Police confirm that, following their investigation, Labour deputy leader Angela Rayner will not face any further police action over her living arrangements before her time as an MP.
  - Former Plaid Cymru MP Jonathan Edwards, who represents Carmarthen East and Dinefwr, announces he will not contest his seat at the election; Edwards was asked to leave Plaid in 2022 after accepting a police caution for assaulting his wife.
  - Stormont passes the 2024 Northern Ireland budget, its first in three years, despite opposition from the Ulster Unionist Party, and the Assembly's official opposition, the Social Democratic and Labour Party.
- 29 May –
  - MSPs vote 64–0 to exclude Scotland's former health secretary, Michael Matheson, from the Scottish Parliament for 27 sitting days, and to suspend his salary for 54 days, after he breached expenses rules by accumulating an £11,000 bill on his parliamentary iPad. The governing SNP abstains from voting, and calls for a review of the complaints procedure, suggesting it could be open to bias.
  - The Welsh Conservatives table a motion of no confidence in First Minister Vaughan Gething following several weeks of controversy over donations to his leadership campaign. The motion is scheduled to face a Senedd vote on 5 June.
  - Pat Cullen stands down as chief executive of the Royal College of Nursing in order to seek the nomination as Sinn Féin candidate for Fermanagh and South Tyrone in the general election.
  - Gavin Robinson is ratified as leader of the Democratic Unionist Party, and announces the party will not stand a candidate in Fermanagh and South Tyrone at the general election.
  - The Medicines (Gonadotrophin-Releasing Hormone Analogues) (Emergency Prohibition) (England, Wales and Scotland) Order 2024 introduces an emergency ban on the prescription and supply of puberty blockers to minors.
  - Rishi Sunak visited Cornwall having arrived via night train. He visited the rail maintenance depot in Penzance before going to neighbouring Devon.
  - Nicola Sturgeon announced that she will be active in the SNP campaign in Scotland.
  - Ed Davey campaigned in Wales with Jane Dodds. He said that his party was confident in winning both of the parliamentary constituencies in Powys.
- 30 May –
  - Parliament is dissolved in preparation for the general election.
  - Mark Logan, the former Conservative MP for Bolton North East, tells BBC News he is backing Labour at the general election, describing the party as offering "centrist politics".
  - The Plaid Cymru campaign is launched in Bangor.
  - The Green campaign is launched in Bristol.
- 31 May
  - Keir Starmer says Diane Abbott is free to stand as the Labour candidate in Hackney North.
  - Conservative MP Aaron Bell announces he will stand down at the election.
  - Former Conservative MP Julian Knight announces he will stand as an independent in Solihull West and Shirley.
  - Labour confirms that Torsten Bell, chief executive of the Resolution Foundation, will be its candidate for Swansea West at the general election.

=== June ===
- 2 June –
  - Diane Abbott confirms she will run as Labour's candidate for Hackney North and Stoke Newington at the general election.
  - Media, including BBC News, report that Derbyshire Police are reviewing allegations of election fraud relating to "concerns around marketing material" posted on social media by Robert Largan, MP and Conservative candidate for High Peak.
- 3 June –
  - Nigel Farage announces that, contrary to his statement earlier in the campaign, he will stand for Parliament in Clacton, and that he has resumed leadership of Reform UK.
  - The Medicines (Gonadotrophin-Releasing Hormone Analogues) (Emergency Prohibition) (England, Wales and Scotland) Order 2024 is scheduled to come into force.
  - The first 2024 leaders debate takes place in Scotland, with the leaders of Scotland's four main political parties taking part in a debate on STV.
  - The UK government tells the High Court it has delayed the start date for flights sending asylum seekers to Rwanda to 24 July.
  - The Welsh Government shelves plans to legislate for shorter school summer holidays in Wales until after the next Senedd election.
- 4 June –
  - ITV airs Sunak v Starmer: The ITV Debate, a head-to-head election debate between Rishi Sunak and Keir Starmer presented by Julie Etchingham. During the debate Sunak says that Labour has a £38bn spending shortfall which would require it to raise taxes by £2,000 for the average household by the end of the next parliament. A letter from James Bowler, the Permanent Secretary to the Treasury, subsequently emerges in which he says the Conservative allegations "should not be presented as having been produced by the civil service".
  - Faiza Shaheen is deselected as Labour candidate for Chingford and Woodford Green and subsequently resigns from the party.
  - Two people are arrested after a milkshake is thrown at Reform UK leader Nigel Farage as he launches his campaign in Clacton.
- 5 June –
  - Alba Party leader Alex Salmond confirms he will not stand in the general election, but instead plans to stand in the 2026 Scottish Parliament election in Banff and Buchan.
  - First Minister of Wales Vaughan Gething loses a nonbinding vote of no confidence in the Senedd with members voting 29–27 in favour of a motion put forward by the Welsh Conservatives. It follows an investigation into the activities of a leading donor to his election campaign. Gething says he will not resign following the vote.
  - Richard Holden is selected as the Conservative candidate for Basildon and Billericay.
  - David Duguid is prevented from standing as the Conservative candidate in Aberdeenshire North and Moray East. Instead, Douglas Ross, who had previously intended to stand down at the election, announces he will contest the constituency at a press conference the next day.
- 6 June –
  - The Office for Statistics Regulation criticises Sunak for his comments about Labour tax rises, saying most people would have been unaware the figures related to a four year period.
  - The FDA trade union which represents senior civil servants launches its High Court case against the UK government over the Rwanda asylum plan, arguing that they could be asked to break the law by ministers if they were asked to ignore a ruling from the European Court of Human Rights to halt a flight to Rwanda.
  - Labour abandons legal action against five Corbyn-era employees who were accused of "conspiring" against Keir Starmer's leadership.
  - It is revealed that the Conservatives accepted a further donation from Frank Hester after he was accused of making racist comments about Diane Abbott.
- 7 June –
  - The legal deadline for candidates in the general election passes.
  - Rishi Sunak apologises for leaving the D-day memorial early to return to the UK to give an ITV interview about the election. He says: "On reflection, it was a mistake not to stay in France longer – and I apologise."
  - Keith Vaz, who stood down from Parliament after he was found to have "expressed willingness" to buy cocaine for male prostitutes, will stand in his old Leicester East constituency for the One Leicester Party.
  - Mishal Husain moderates the first of the BBC's election debates featuring representatives from seven of the UK's political parties. Appearing on the programme are Penny Mordaunt (Conservative), Angela Rayner (Labour), Daisy Cooper (Liberal Democrats), Stephen Flynn (SNP), Rhun ap Iorwerth (Plaid Cymru), Carla Denyer (Green) and Nigel Farage (Reform UK).
  - The Unite trade union says it will not endorse Labour's election manifesto because it does not go far enough on protecting the rights of workers.
  - The Green Party says it has blocked a "small number" of candidates from standing as Green candidates at the election after investigations into their online activities.
  - Plaid Cymru withdraws its support for Sharifah Rahman, who was scheduled to represent the party as a candidate in Cardiff South and Penarth, following social media posts about the "situation in the Middle East" that "do not reflect the views and values of Plaid Cymru".
  - The Senedd Reform Bill Committee has warned that plans for gender quotas at the next Senedd election could face legal challenges, and urges the Welsh Government to take urgent action to protect the election.
- 8 June –
  - Stewart Sutherland, the Reform UK candidate for Blaenau Gwent and Rhymney, withdraws his candidacy after allegations he reported racist content.
  - Social media platform X takes action against an organisation that has been smearing British politicians with deepfake videos by removing a number of accounts.
- 9 June – The Sunday Mail reports allegations that Scottish Conservative leader Douglas Ross used Westminster expenses to travel in his role as a football linesman.
- 10 June –
  - The list of candidates standing in the 2024 general election is published, with more than 4,500 candidates setting a new record for the number of people standing at an election.
  - Douglas Ross announces his resignation as leader of the Scottish Conservatives, triggering a leadership election. Ross says he will also resign from Holyrood if he is re-elected to Westminster.
  - Ian Gribbin, the Reform UK candidate for Bexhill and Battle, apologises after saying the UK would be "far better" if it had "taken Hitler up on his offer of neutrality" instead of fighting World War II.
  - Reform UK leader Nigel Farage gives his personal backing to two Democratic Unionist Party candidates despite his party's alliance with Traditional Unionist Voice.
- 11 June –
  - A 28-year-old man is arrested on suspicion of public order offences after objects are thrown at Nigel Farage during a campaign tour in Barnsley.
  - Rishi Sunak unveils the Conservative Party's general election manifesto, which includes a further cut in National Insurance, a halving of immigration, and several new housing policies.
  - BBC Scotland airs an election debate featuring the leaders of Scotland's five main political parties: John Swinney (SNP), Douglas Ross (Scottish Conservatives), Anas Sarwar (Scottish Labour), Alex Cole-Hamilton (Scottish Liberal Democrats) and Lorna Slater (Scottish Greens).
  - Sophie Raworth pulls out of presenting the BBC's The Prime Ministerial Debate, scheduled to air on 26 June, after fracturing her ankle; Mishal Husain will present instead.
  - Robin Harper, a former leader of the Scottish Greens, joins Scottish Labour, citing his former party's failure on the environment for his decision.
  - Vaughan Gething tells the Senedd he regrets the "impact" of his decision to accept a £200,000 donation from a man whose company was convicted of illegally dumping waste.
- 12 June –
  - The Green Party launches its manifesto, with key points including increasing taxes for the better off, and higher spending on healthcare, housing and climate change.
  - Sky News presenter Beth Rigby presents an election debate from Grimsby Town Hall, where Sunak and Starmer face questions from an audience.
  - Craig Williams, who served as Sunak's Parliamentary Private Secretary, is being investigated by the Gambling Commission after placing a bet on the date of the general election. Williams subsequently describes the bet as a "huge error of judgement".
  - Dr Anne McCloskey, an independent general election candidate for Foyle, is sentenced to 14 days in prison for non-payment of a COVID-19 related fine by Derry Magistrates.
  - Police say they are aware of YouTuber and internet prankster Niko Omilana, who has registered himself as a general election candidate in 11 different constituencies.
- 13 June –
  - Keir Starmer unveils the Labour Party's general election manifesto. He says that wealth creation is the "number one priority" and that Labour will focus on economic growth.
  - The Green Party is forced to temporarily remove its manifesto from its website after facing criticism for using an image of an ill man to illustrate its policy on HIV.
  - Plaid Cymru launches its 2024 election manifesto, which includes plans for Welsh independence, 500 extra GPs and funding from rail improvements.
  - A YouGov poll for The Times puts Reform UK ahead of the Conservatives for the first time, with Reform on 19% and the Conservatives on 18%; the poll prompts Reform leader Nigel Farage to say his party is "now the opposition to Labour".
  - ITV holds a debate featuring senior figures from the UK's seven main political parties and moderated by Julie Etchingham.
- 14 June –
  - Data published by the Electoral Commission indicates that Labour raised £351,990 more in donations than the Conservatives during the first week of the general election campaign.
  - BBC Wales sees a series of text messages from the mobile phone of Welsh Conservative Senedd member Laura Anne Jones in which she appears to ask an employee to maximise her expenses claims. Jones is subsequently asked to step back from Wales's Shadow Cabinet as a result of the revelation.
  - A coalition of commercial media and content businesses write to Labour to urge them not to introduce advertising on the BBC, fearing it could have a negative impact on consumers, licence fee payers and creative industries.
  - The Independent Parliamentary Standards Authority clears Douglas Ross of misusing his travel expenses following an investigation.
  - Labour's Rosie Duffield, who is campaigning to be re-elected as MP for Canterbury, says she has withdrawn from hustings events because she does not feel safe; Duffield has previously faced death threats for her stance on sex and gender.
  - Among those from the world of politics to be recognised in the 2024 Birthday Honours is former prime minister Gordon Brown, who is made a Companion of Honour, and former MP Wayne David, who receives a knighthood.
- 16 June –
  - Grant StClair-Armstrong, the Reform UK candidate for North West Essex, resigns from the party after historic blog posts emerge in which he urged people to vote for the British National Party.
  - ITV Wales holds an election debate between senior figures from the three main political parties in Wales; David TC Davies (Conservative), Jo Stevens (Labour) and Liz Saville Roberts (Plaid Cymru).
- 17 June –
  - Nigel Farage launches Reform UK's election manifesto, which he describes as a contract, and which chiefly proposes a freeze on non-essential immigration.
  - Lord Cashman is suspended from the Parliamentary Labour Party for describing Rosie Duffield as "frit or lazy" in a social media post for withdrawing from hustings meetings over concerns for her safety.
  - BBC Sounds launches an Election 2024 livestream, bringing together all the election news and programming, such as Newscast, Today, Question Time and Sunday with Laura Kuenssberg. The livestream is scheduled to run until 8 July.
- 18 June –
  - LBC's Nick Ferrari presents the first of two editions of Britain's Next PM, a phone-in giving listeners the opportunity to speak to Keir Starmer and Rishi Sunak, with Starmer appearing on the first edition and Sunak the following day.
  - The deadline for people wishing to register to vote in time for the 2024 general election expires at 23:59.
  - Sunak announces that former prime minister Johnson will endorse Conservative candidates by writing to constituents urging them not to vote for Reform, saying to do so will "make a difference".
  - The state visit of Japan's Emperor Naruhito is to be modified to omit the usual visit to 10 Downing Street because it coincides with the election.
  - Scottish Labour launches its general election manifesto.
  - Businessman John Caudwell, the founder of Phones4U, who gave the Conservatives a £500,000 donation before the 2019 general election, tells the BBC he will be voting Labour for the first time in his life at the 2024 election.
  - During an election debate on BBC Radio 4's Woman's Hour, representatives from Labour, the Liberal Democrats, Greens and Scottish National Party express their support for making misogyny a hate crime.
- 19 June –
  - A police officer working as part of the prime minister's close protection team is suspended and later arrested as part of an ongoing investigation into bets on the date of the general election.
  - The Scottish National Party launches its election manifesto, with plans to "end Westminster cuts" and increase investment in the NHS. The party would also view winning a majority of Scotland's seats at Westminster as a mandate to begin independence negotiations.
  - Labour suspends Andy Brown, its candidate for Aberdeenshire North and Moray East after he was found to have shared pro-Russian posts online.
  - The Scottish Family Party launches its election manifesto, chiefly promoting family values.
  - After details of past social media posts made by two Reform UK candidates, Lee Bunker and Angela Begbie-Carter, are reported in the media, the party releases a statement in which it says candidates are free to express views that "are not shared by all their party colleagues" as they are not "political zombies".
  - Secret government files seen by BBC News show work has been underway with consultants since January to limit "severe implications" to essential IT services by lining up alternative providers after Atos, the UK subsidiary of which has contracts for NHS records and disability benefit claims, is more than £3bn in debt and undergoing restructuring.
  - Sinn Féin launches its 2024 election manifesto, which includes plans for the transfer of fiscal powers from Westminster to Stormont and the creation of an all-Ireland national health service.
  - Businessman Zia Yusuf donates an undisclosed amount of money, but reported to be several thousand pounds, to Reform UK, saying the UK has "lost control of our borders".
  - The Workers Party of Britain launches its election manifesto, with promises to improve "poverty pay" and provide more social housing.
  - BBC News reports that Laura Saunders, the Conservative candidate for Bristol North West, has become the second Conservative candidate to face an investigation by the Gambling Commission over betting on the date of the general election. It is subsequently reported that her husband, Tony Lee, the Conservative Party's campaigns director, is also being investigated by the Commission.
- 20 June –
  - BBC One airs a Question Time election special featuring the leaders of the UK's four main political parties.
  - Sunak says he is "incredibly angry" to learn of allegations that members of his party have betted on the date of the election, and that he will "boot out" anyone found to have broken the law.
  - Scottish Parliament authorities have launched an investigation into the potential misuse of expenses to buy postage stamps by members of the SNP in order to send letters to voters.
  - The Alliance Party launches its general election manifesto, with plans including reform of the devolved government at Stormont, and ringfencing funding for integrated eductation.
- 21 June –
  - Nigel Farage tells the BBC that he believes the Russian invasion of Ukraine to have been precipitated by the West's eastward expansion of NATO and the European Union, but that the war itself is Vladimir Putin's fault.
  - BBC Wales airs a televised election debate featuring Vaughan Gething (Labour), Jane Dodds (Liberal Democrat), Rhun ap Iorwerth (Plaid Cymru) and David TC Davies (Conservative).
- 22 June –
  - BBC News publishes a list of eight Reform UK candidates who have made a wide range of offensive online posts about women between 2011 and 2023.
  - Following criticism from other party leaders over his comments about Putin, Nigel Farage pens an op-ed in The Telegraph in which he says he has never been an "apologist or supporter" of Putin, but that "if you poke the Russian bear with a stick, don't be surprised if he responds".
- 23 June –
  - 2024 United Kingdom general election date betting controversy
    - The Sunday Times reports that Nick Mason, the Conservative Party's chief data officer, has become the fourth person to face investigation by the Gambling Commission for alleged betting on the date of the election. Mason denies any wrongdoing.
    - BBC News reports that the Gambling Commission's investigation involves more people than those already named.
  - The constituency office of Labour Walthamstow candidate Stella Creasy is damaged overnight by vandals.
  - UTV airs a general election debate featuring candidates from Northern Ireland's five main political parties: The Democratic Unionist Party's leader Gavin Robinson, Sinn Féin's John Finucane, Social Democratic and Labour Party leader Colum Eastwood, Alliance Party leader Naomi Long and Ulster Unionist Party deputy leader Robbie Butler.
- 24 June –
  - Sunak says that he is "not aware of any other" Conservative candidates being investigated by the Gambling Commission.
  - The Institute for Fiscal Studies says that it will be a "considerable surprise" if UK taxes do not rise in the next five years and says the two main parties are "ducking" the issue in their manifestos.
  - The Scottish Conservatives launch their election manifesto, which includes plans to improve teachers' pay, cut the backlog of NHS waiting lists, and to beat the SNP.
  - The Democratic Unionist Party launches its 2024 election manifesto, with policies including greater access to healthcare, opposition to assisted suicide and the removal of trade barriers within the UK.
  - Claire Darke, former mayor of Wolverhampton and a longtime Labour councillor, resigns from the Labour Party, citing disillusionment with its direction under Keir Starmer. She specifically criticizes the party's stance on austerity and its "morally wrong" position on Gaza, which she sees as neglecting the suffering of the Palestinian people.
- 25 June –
  - Emperor Naruhito and Empress Masako of Japan begin their state visit to the United Kingdom.
  - 2024 United Kingdom general election date betting controversy:
    - The Conservative Party withdraws its support for Craig Williams and Laura Saunders as election candidates.
    - Cabinet minister Alister Jack, who previously said he had won £2,100 by betting on the date of the election, then said he was joking, issues a statement in which he says he did not place a bet on the election.
    - Russell George, the Senedd member for Montgomeryshire, becomes the fifth Conservative politician to be investigated by the Gambling Commission for election betting.
    - The Metropolitan Police confirms that the Gambling Commission are investigating a further five police officers for placing bets on the date of the election.
    - Labour suspends Kevin Craig, their candidate for Central Suffolk and North Ipswich, after the Gambling Commission launches an unrelated investigation into him for placing a bet against himself losing in his constituency.
  - LBC's Nick Ferrari moderates an immigration policy debate between Home Secretary James Cleverly and Shadow Home Secretary Yvette Cooper.
- 26 June –
  - 2024 United Kingdom general election betting scandal
    - Alex Cole-Hamilton, leader of the Scottish Liberal Democrats, admits to placing bets on Scottish Liberal Democrat election candidates, but says he did not place bets on the date of the election itself.
    - The Sun reports that Sir Philip Davies, the Conservative candidate for Shipley, allegedly placed an £8,000 bet on whether he would lose his seat at the election, which has a majority of 6,242.
  - Police arrest a woman in her 20s in connection with the Westminster "honeytrap" scandal in which a number of MPs were sent unsolicited text messages, some of them explicit.
  - Mishal Husain moderates The Prime Ministerial Debate, the BBC's head-to-head debate between Rishi Sunak and Keir Starmer.
  - Welsh Labour suspends Rhianon Passmore, the Senedd member for Islwyn, pending investigation following an allegation she was seen driving a car with two different number plates.
  - The Social Democratic and Labour Party (SDLP) launches its election manifesto, which includes a "Marshall Plan" to address the backlog in Northern Ireland's health service, reforms to Stormont, and a repeal of the Troubles Legacy Act.
- 27 June –
  - The Metropolitan Police says that at least seven police officers are now being investigated for placing bets on the date of the general election.
  - Reform UK condemns campaigners in Clacton who were filmed by an undercover reporter for Channel 4 News making racist, homophobic and Islamophobic comments, including one who used a racial slur to describe Prime Minister Rishi Sunak. The party says those involved will no longer be involved in the election campaign.
  - Prominent Conservative donor Sir John Hall endorses Reform UK.
  - The final televised debate of the 2024 general election takes place on BBC One Northern Ireland and features representatives from Northern Ireland's five main parties.
  - Labour lifts its suspension of Rhianon Passmore after police say they had found no offence was committed regarding the number plates on her car.
- 28 June –
  - Sunak speaks of his hurt and anger at his daughters having to hear a racial slur used about him by Reform UK activists.
  - Essex Police say they are urgently trying to establish whether any criminal offences have been committed as a result of comments made by the Reform campaigners.
  - Mark Hoath, the Reform UK candidate for Sutton Coldfield, is referred to the police after saying that a rival candidate, the Liberal Democrats' John Sweeney, "loved" the IRA.
  - Edinburgh City Council establishes an emergency polling booth at City Chambers after a number of people across Scotland reported not receiving their postal votes. The emergency polling booth, which allows those who did not receive a postal vote to cast their vote in person, will operate until 30 June. Fife Council also announces an emergency polling booth at Fife House, Glenrothes that will be open on 29 June.
  - The Green Party of Northern Ireland launches its manifesto, which includes plans to take Lough Neagh into public ownership, reforms to Stormont, a tax on the richest one percent of people and protecting public services from cuts.
- 29 June –
  - A spokesman for Reform UK confirms the party has dropped three candidates for making offensive comments. They are Edward Oakenfull (Derbyshire Dales), Robert Lomas (Barnsley North), and Leslie Lilley (Southend East and Rochford), but the candidates will still appear on the ballot paper as Reform candidates because it is too late for them to be removed.
  - East Lothian Council becomes the third local authority to establish an emergency facility for people who have not received their postal votes.
  - The Northern Ireland Conservatives launch their election manifesto with the help of Chris Heaton-Harris, the Secretary of State for Northern Ireland. Policies include upholding the Good Friday Agreement and continuing to invest in Northern Ireland. The Conservatives are fielding five candidates in Northern Ireland.
- 30 June –
  - The Sunday Times endorses the Labour Party for the first time since the 2001 general election.
  - Liam Booth-Isherwood, the Reform UK candidate for Erewash, disowns the party, citing a "significant moral issue" following recent reports of "widespread racism and sexism", and gives his backing to the Conservatives.

=== July ===
- 2 July –
  - Georgie David, the Reform UK candidate for West Ham and Beckton becomes the party's second candidate to suspend their campaign and defect to the Conservatives, and says the "vast majority" of her fellow Reform candidates are "racist, misogynistic and bigoted".
  - The Welsh Government says it plans to bring in a ban on Welsh politicians telling lies before the 2026 Senedd election.
- 3 July –
  - The Sun endorses the Labour Party ahead of the general election.
  - Essex Police announce that no offences were committed by the Reform UK campaigners recorded making racist comments by Channel 4 News.
  - An investigation concludes that former Conservative government minister Owen Paterson acted as a lobbyist for a healthcare company without being registered to do so.
  - Mick Antoniw, the Counsel General for Wales, apologises after being formally reprimanded by the Senedd for tweeting "Tories so happy to see people and particularly children killed and injured on our roads".
  - A hearing at Newry Magistrates Court rules there is sufficient evidence for former DUP leader Sir Jeffrey Donaldson to stand trial on charges of historical sexual abuse.
- 4 July –
  - The 2024 United Kingdom general election takes place.
  - 2024 Dissolution Honours: Nominations for peerages include Theresa May (former prime minister), Chris Grayling (former justice secretary), Sir Graham Brady (chair of the 1922 Committee), Craig Mackinlay (Conservative MP), Harriet Harman (former deputy leader of the Labour Party), Margaret Beckett (former foreign secretary), Margaret Hodge (former Labour MP), and Dr Hilary Cass (chair of the Cass Review).
- 5 July
  - Results of the 2024 United Kingdom general election:
    - Sir Keir Starmer becomes the new prime minister of the United Kingdom, following a landslide victory for Labour in the general election.
    - The Conservatives are reduced to just 121 seats, the lowest number of MPs in their 190-year history. Among the high-profile losses are former prime minister Liz Truss, former cabinet minister Sir Jacob Rees-Mogg, Commons leader Penny Mordaunt, and Defence Secretary Grant Shapps.
    - The Liberal Democrats, led by Sir Ed Davey, achieve their best ever result with 71 seats.
    - The Green Party achieve their best ever result, quadrupling their number of seats to four.
    - Reform UK gain their first seats in Parliament, which includes party leader Nigel Farage taking the constituency of Clacton.
    - The SNP suffers heavy losses, going from 48 seats to just nine.
    - Sinn Féin wins seven seats, making it the largest party across Northern Ireland.
  - Starmer ministry: Starmer appoints his first cabinet. This includes Angela Rayner as Deputy Prime Minister and Rachel Reeves as Chancellor of the Exchequer, making her the first woman to hold the office.
- 6 July –
  - Inverness, Skye and West Ross-shire becomes the final constituency to declare its election results, and sees the number of Liberal Democrat MPs rise to 72 after they defeat the SNP to win the seat.
  - At his first press conference since taking office, Starmer announces that he wants to cut instances of re-offending to reduce the prison population.
  - James Timpson is appointed as Minister of State for Prisons, Parole and Probation.
  - Starmer announces the Rwanda asylum plan is "dead and buried".
- 7 July –
  - Starmer makes his first visit to Scotland as prime minister, for a meeting with First Minister John Swinney.
  - Jacqui Smith is appointed as Minister of State for Skills, Apprenticeships and Higher Education, while Douglas Alexander becomes Business Minister.
  - The Starmer administration announces that the final two migrants due to be deported to Rwanda will be released on bail in the next few days; a further 218 are confirmed to have been released on bail by the Sunak administration before the election.
  - Home Secretary Yvette Cooper outlines plans to establish a UK Border Security Command whose task it will be to reduce small boat crossings in the English Channel.
- 8 July –
  - Chancellor Rachel Reeves announces plans to bring back compulsory housebuilding targets as part of plans to reboot the UK economy.
  - Education Secretary Bridget Phillipson writes to all teachers in the education sector saying she wants to "reset the relationship" with the sector as part of plans to recruit an extra 6,500 teachers.
  - Sunak reshuffles his shadow cabinet, with Andrew Mitchell replacing David Cameron as Shadow Foreign Secretary after the latter resigns. Richard Fuller replaces Richard Holden as Conservative Party Chairman after Holden resigns from the role.
- 9 July –
  - Starmer meets England's 12 regional mayors to discuss "a major programme of devolution" of powers from Westminster to local government.
  - The first meeting of the new 2024 Parliament of the United Kingdom takes place.
  - The Ministry of Housing, Communities and Levelling Up reverts to its pre-Johnson era name of the Ministry of Housing, Communities and Local Government.
  - New Health Secretary Wes Streeting begins talks with junior doctors in England aimed at ending their pay dispute.
  - Starmer makes the unusual move of appointing five newly elected MPs to government posts: Georgia Gould is appointed as a parliamentary secretary in the Cabinet Office, Miatta Fahnbulleh is appointed as a junior minister in the Department for Energy Security and Net Zero, Alistair Carns is appointed as Minister of State for Veterans' Affairs, Sarah Sackman is appointed as Solicitor General, and Kirsty McNeill is appointed as a junior minister in the Scotland Office.
  - In an open letter to SNP members following the party's defeat in Scotland, former deputy leader Jim Sillars has described John Swinney's leadership as "a busted flush" and Nicola Sturgeon as "Stalin's wee sister".
- 10 July –
  - Starmer travels to Washington, D.C., his first foreign trip as UK prime minister, to attend the 75th NATO summit.
  - The following retirements from the House of Lords are announced by Lord McFall of Alcluith by virtue of non-attendance: John Prescott, Conrad Black and Jeffrey Archer.
- 11 July –
  - The SNP confirms it will have to make the majority of its Westminster staff redundant after Parliament reduces its "Short Money" – the annual amount paid to opposition parties – by £1m.
  - Peter Martin becomes the DUP MLA for North Down after the previous incumbent, Alex Easton was elected to Westminster.
  - A week after his election to Parliament, GB News announces that Nigel Farage is returning to his show on the channel, presenting on Tuesdays, Wednesdays and Thursdays from 16 July.
- 12 July – Justice Secretary Shabana Mahmood confirms that thousands of prisoners in England and Wales will be released early from their sentences at the beginning of September, warning of the "total collapse" of the prison system and a "total breakdown of law and order" without steps being taken to ease prison overcrowding.
- 14 July –
  - Leading UK political figures, including Sir Keir Starmer and Nigel Farage, condemn the previous day's attempted assassination of Donald Trump in the United States.
  - Foreign Secretary David Lammy makes his first visit to Israel and the Palestinian territory to hold talks with leaders.
  - Lord Walney, the UK government's adviser on political violence, writes to the Home Secretary urging an inquiry into potential intimidation of candidates at the general election by groups in different constituencies.
  - Buckingham Palace announces that King Charles III and Queen Camilla will visit Australia and Samoa in October.
- 15 July –
  - Records show the Conservative Party accepted a £50,000 from Westminster Development Services Limited, a company established in 2015 by a consortium led by the Hinduja Group shortly after its chairman, Prakash Hinduja, was sent to prison for exploiting domestic staff.
  - Records show that Labour received £9.5m in donations during the general election campaign, more than the other parties combined.
  - Mark Innes is given a three-year restraining order for sending aggressive and threatening messages to Sir Lindsay Hoyle, the Speaker of the House of Commons.
- 16 July –
  - Deputy Prime Minister Angela Rayner dismisses remarks from JD Vance, Donald Trump's running mate in the 2024 United States presidential election, that Britain under Labour could become the first "truly Islamist" country with nuclear weapons.
  - Vaughan Gething resigns as First Minister of Wales after cabinet members Mick Antoniw, Lesley Griffiths, Julie James and Jeremy Miles resign from the Welsh Government and call on him to quit.
- 17 July – 2024 State Opening of Parliament: Labour sets out its legislative programme for its first parliamentary session in the King's Speech. Proposals include bills to renationalise the railways, to strengthen the rights of workers, tackle illegal immigration, reform the House of Lords, and undertake a programme to speed up the delivery of "high quality infrastructure" and housing.
- 18 July – Starmer pledges £84m in funding for education, employment and humanitarian projects in Africa and the Middle East designed to stop illegal migration "at source".
- 19 July –
  - Ukrainian president Volodymyr Zelenskyy visits Downing Street and addresses the cabinet, becoming the first foreign leader to address a British cabinet since 1997, and urges Keir Starmer to "show your leadership" by helping to remove restrictions on the use of weapons supplied to Ukraine.
  - Sunak makes junior appointments to his shadow frontbench team, including some newly elected MPs, meaning 51 of the 121 Conservative MPs in parliament now have shadow ministerial posts.
  - Foreign Secretary David Lammy confirms the UK will resume funding UNRWA, the UN's agency for Palestinian refugees.
  - Shadow Secretary of State for Health and Social Care Victoria Atkins is criticised by House of Commons Deputy Speaker Christopher Chope for her behaviour during a parliamentary debate after she loudly interrupted Steve Reed, the Secretary of State for Environment, Food and Rural Affairs as he addressed the House.
- 20 July –
  - Figures produced by the Institute for Fiscal Studies suggest the UK government would need to spend an extra £3bn to implement a 5.5% pay rise for teaching and NHS staff.
  - July 2024 Welsh Labour leadership election:
    - Welsh Labour officials agree a timeline for the election, with a new leader to be in place on 14 September.
    - Nominations open for candidates entering the leadership contest.
- 21 July –
  - Writing in the Sun on Sunday, Home Secretary Yvette Cooper announces that car washes and beauty salons will be targeted by immigration officials over the summer in a bid to crack down on businesses illegally hiring workers from overseas.
  - Former Chancellor Jeremy Hunt, who was Health Secretary for a number of years before the COVID-19 pandemic, apologises "unreservedly" to the families of people who died from the illness after a report prepared by the COVID-19 Inquiry found significant flaws in the government's strategy for dealing with the pandemic.
- 22 July –
  - Home Secretary Yvette Cooper confirms the UK government will resume processing asylum applications, including those from people who arrived in the UK illegally. She also tells the House of Commons the previous government's Rwanda asylum plan cost £700m, with only four people being removed to the country voluntarily. The shadow home secretary, James Cleverly, says Cooper's words are "hyperbole" and "made up numbers", adding that Labour had scrapped scheme on "ideological grounds" and that its purpose was as a deterrent.
  - Launch of Skills England, a government body whose objective will be to reduce the need for overseas employees by improving skills training for people in England.
  - 2024 Conservative Party leadership election: The Conservative Party's 1922 Committee sets out a timeline for the election of the next leader, with the successful candidate scheduled to be announced in early November.
  - July 2024 Welsh Labour leadership election: Eluned Morgan becomes the first candidate to enter the leadership race.
  - Plaid Cymru expels Senedd member Rhys ab Owen after he was found to have inappropriately touched and sworn at two women while drunk at a party.
  - Former Chancellor Nadhim Zahawi, who stood down from Parliament at the general election, is reported to be seeking financial backers in order to bid for the Daily Telegraph and The Spectator.
- 23 July –
  - Seven Labour MPs, including former shadow chancellor John McDonnell and former shadow minister Rebecca Long-Bailey, have the Labour whip suspended for six months after voting against the government and in favour of an SNP amendment to scrap the two-child benefit cap. McDonnel said, "I'm following Keir Starmer's example as he said put country before party".
  - The Home Office confirms that contract for the Bibby Stockholm, the vessel used to house asylum seekers, will not be renewed after January 2025.
  - Documents released by The National Archives reveal that former prime minister Harold Wilson agreed to sell his private papers late in life in order to provide funds for his care. A deal agreed with Canada's McMaster University in 1990 attracted concern from the Cabinet Office because documents relating to his time in office remained private under the thirty year rule, which would not apply if they went to Canada. They were eventually sold to Oxford's Bodleian Library.
  - 2024 Conservative Party leadership election: James Cleverly, who served as home secretary and foreign secretary in the Sunak government, announces his intention to run for the post of Conservative Party leader.
- 24 July –
  - Starmer attends his first PMQs as prime minister.
  - 2024 Conservative Party leadership election: Nominations open for the first round of the leadership election.
  - July 2024 Welsh Labour leadership election:
    - Eluned Morgan is elected unopposed as the new leader of Welsh Labour after nominations close at midday.
    - The Senedd will be recalled on 6 August to choose a new First Minister of Wales following the resignation of Vaughan Gething and the subsequent Welsh Labour leadership election.
- 25 July – Conservative Party leadership election: Tom Tugendhat and Robert Jenrick enter the race to become the next Conservative leader.
- 26 July –
  - Labour peer Lord Falconer introduces the Assisted Dying Bill into the House of Lords. The bill would allow anyone with a terminal illness and less than six months left to live to get medical assistance to end their life.
  - Following a critical report on the Care Quality Commission, Health Secretary Wes Streeting describes the body as not fit for purpose.
  - Conservative Party leadership election: Former Work and Pensions Secretary Mel Stride becomes the fourth candidate to announce his intention to run for the Conservative Party leadership election.
- 27 July – Conservative Party leadership election: Priti Patel becomes the fifth candidate to put their name forward for the election, standing as a unity candidate.
- 28 July – Labour accuses the previous Conservative government of "covering up" "catastrophic" problems in the public sector and creating a multi-billion pound gap in public finances. The Conservatives say Labour are "lying" and "peddling nonsense" as all the detail of public finances has been put into the public domain by the Office for Budget Responsibility since 2010. Former chancellor, Jeremy Hunt, says "the books have been wide open and what they show is a healthy, growing economy – not the fiction Labour is now peddling which is widely rejected by independent commentators" and that "trying to scam the British people so soon after being elected is a high-risk strategy doomed to fail".
- 29 July –
  - The UK government and the British Medical Association (BMA) reach agreement on an improved pay deal for junior doctors in England worth 22% on average over two years, which the BMA will put to its members.
  - 2024 United Kingdom Spending Review:
    - Chancellor Rachel Reeves conducts a spending review in which she axes winter fuel payments for pensioners not receiving pension credit (roughly around 10 million people), while also announcing the cancellation of several infrastructure projects. Reeves argues she has had to make "necessary and urgent decisions" because of an "unfunded" and "undisclosed" overspending of £21.9bn by the previous government. Shadow Chancellor Jeremy Hunt dismisses her allegations as "spurious".
    - The new Labour government scraps the controversial proposed Stonehenge road tunnel.
    - Reeves confirms 30 October as the date of the Autumn budget.
    - In response to Reeves' allegations about public services, Hunt writes to Cabinet Secretary Simon Case, who heads the civil service, to dispute Labour's allegations and request an "immediate answer" to "conflicting claims" that risk "bringing the civil service into disrepute".
  - 2024 Conservative Party leadership election:
    - Kemi Badenoch becomes the sixth person to enter the leadership race.
    - Nominations close for candidates to be included in the first round of the leadership contest.
  - The UK government drops its appeal against a court ruling against the Troubles Legacy Act that found part of the legislation to be unlawful.
- 30 July – Housing Secretary Angela Rayner reintroduces mandatory local housing targets in an overhaul of planning rules; the new Labour government has pledged to build 1.5 million new homes by 2029.
- 31 July –
  - Energy Secretary Ed Miliband announces an increase in the budget for the annual renewable energy auction, which will rise to £1.5bn, up by £500m from 2023.
  - Tulip Siddiq, Economic Secretary to the Treasury and Labour MP for Hampstead and Highgate, becomes the first MP of the new Parliament to be placed under investigation by the Standards Commissioner, over a failure to register rental income on a London property.

=== August ===
- 2 August – The BBC reports that Labour has shelved £1.3bn of funding promised by the Conservatives for tech and artificial intelligence (AI) projects, including an exascale supercomputer at Edinburgh University.
- 6 August –
  - The UK government begins the process of drawing up legislation to abolish the Strikes (Minimum Service Levels) Act 2023, which required striking workers such as teachers, firefighters and railway staff to provide a minimum level of service.
  - The Senedd is recalled to choose a new First Minister of Wales, with Eluned Morgan nominated to become the first woman to hold the post.
- 7 August –
  - Ofcom have received more than 8,200 complaints about two interviews during the 5 August edition of Good Morning Britain – the first involving presenter Ed Balls who spoke to his wife, Home Secretary Yvette Cooper, and the second involving an interview Balls and Kate Garraway did with Labour MP Zarah Sultana.
  - Mark Drakeford, Wales's former first minister, returns to government after he is appointed health secretary by Eluned Morgan.
- 8 August –
  - The Northern Ireland Assembly is recalled to discuss the 2024 United Kingdom riots.
  - Nominations open for the 2024 Scottish Conservatives leadership election.
  - Ricky Jones, a Labour councillor in Dartford, is suspended by his party and arrested over comments made at an anti-racism rally the previous day in which he suggested far-right protestors who took part in the 2024 UK riots should have their throats cut.
  - Lauren Edwards, the Labour MP for Rochester and Strood, apologises after, what she describes as "a small number of", offensive tweets posted by her in 2009 resurface.
- 9 August –
  - Dartford councillor Ricky Jones is charged with encouraging violent disorder.
  - Conservative Senedd member Laura Anne Jones apologises for her use of an ethnic slur about Chinese people during a WhatsApp discussion about TikTok.
- 12 August – 2024 United Kingdom riots: Downing Street confirms that Starmer has cancelled his planned summer holiday in order to continue to address the violence.
- 14 August –
  - The Scottish Government confirms it will follow the UK government by scrapping universal winter fuel payments for pensioners, with the benefit to be means tested.
  - Jess Phillips apologises for a tweet she made regarding the summer riots.
- 15 August – Chancellor Rachel Reeves faces questions about the appointment of a Labour Party donor to a senior role at HM Treasury.
- 16 August –
  - David Lammy visits Israel with his French counterpart Stéphane Séjourné, and they release a joint statement calling for a ceasefire.
  - 2024 Scottish Conservatives leadership election:
    - Four of the six candidates running for the position of Scottish Conservative leader call for the race to be paused after allegations about Douglas Ross's behaviour as leader. The allegations concern a report that in July 2023 Ross had asked for the leader of Moray council, Kathleen Robertson, to stand down as the prospective parliamentary candidate for Moray West, Nairn and Strathspey.
    - Meghan Gallacher resigns as the party's deputy leader, citing a "potential risk to the reputation of our party and the leadership contest" after reports that Ross had previously suggested Russell Findlay should succeed him.
  - The government faces questions about the appointment of Emily Middleton to a senior civil service role, as she has been previously linked to previous donations to the Labour Party.
  - A group of MPs call on the government of Azerbaijan to free an academic from the London School of Economics and Political Science who was detained after writing articles critical of the country's environmental policies.
  - British American academic Alan M. Taylor is appointed to the Bank of England's interest rate-setting committee.
  - The UK government confirms that victims of the contaminated blood scandal will begin receiving compensation before the end of the year, with some being entitled to more than £2.5m.
- 17 August –
  - It is reported that the Register of Members' Interests shows Reform UK leader Nigel Farage as Britain's highest earning MP, with a monthly salary of £96,000 on top of what he is paid as an MP. The majority of his earnings come from his presenting role on GB News. Farage subsequently says the amount is not a monthly sum, but represents presenting and consultancy work done since April.
  - SNP MSP John Mason is stripped of the party whip after a Twitter post in which he said that Israel's actions in Gaza did not amount to "genocide", something a party spokesperson describes as "completely unacceptable".
- 18 August –
  - The Home Office announces that new plans by the UK government will see extreme misogyny treated as a form of extremism.
  - Mark Smith, an official with the Foreign Office and based at the British Embassy in Dublin, resigns in protest at arms sales to Israel, and suggests the UK government "may be complicit in war crimes".
- 19 August –
  - The UK government activates Operation Early Dawn, its measures to ease prison overcrowding, as more people are given custodial sentences over their roles in the riots. The measures, in place in the north of England and the Midlands, will see defendants waiting to appear in court held at police stations until a prison space is available for them. Jo Stevens, the Secretary of State for Wales, subsequently says that the measures will be in force for "a very short period", typically "a matter of days, or at the most months".
  - The Scottish Government announces it will hold no further talks with Israeli ambassadors until there is "real progress" in resolving the Gaza conflict.
  - Christina McKelvie, the Scottish Government's Minister for Drugs and Alcohol Policy, announces she will step back from the role while receiving treatment for secondary breast cancer. Her duties will be assumed by fellow ministers Neil Gray and Jenni Minto.
  - First Minister of Wales Eluned Morgan holds her first meeting with Prime Minister Keir Starmer since taking office.
  - Doug Beattie resigns as leader of the Ulster Unionist Party, triggering a leadership election.
- 20 August – 2024 Ulster Unionist Party leadership election: Nominations open to elect the next leader of the Ulster Unionist Party.
- 21 August – 2024 Ulster Unionist Party leadership election: Doug Beattie rules himself out of running for re-election as UUP leader.
- 22–23 August –
  - 2024 United Kingdom general election betting scandal: The Metropolitan Police ends its investigation into the betting scandal, saying that the offences being investigated have not met the "high bar" to prove misconduct in public office. The matter remains under investigation by the Gambling Commission.
  - The UK government authorises the Infected Blood Compensation Authority to begin making payments to affected patients.
- 26 August –
  - Keir Starmer cancels the appointment of Gwyn Jenkins as national security adviser.
  - Questions are raised over Waheed Alli and his temporary pass to Number 10.
- 27 August –
  - Keir Starmer delivers his first major speech a speech since becoming prime minister, and warns that the October budget will be "painful".
  - The UK government cancels a £40m helicopter contract agreed by former prime minister Rishi Sunak.
  - The UK government announces an extra £10.5m of funding to prepare for new EU border checks, with major ports receiving extra funding to prepare for the changes.
  - The Scottish Fiscal Commission (SFC) warns the SNP government that “difficult decisions” are needed to balance its budget.
- 28 August –
  - Starmer meets with German chancellor Olaf Scholz in Berlin to discuss UK–EU relations, before attending the Paralympics opening ceremony in Paris.
  - First Minister of Wales Eluned Morgan is appointed a Privy Councillor.
- 29 August –
  - Starmer confirms that the UK government is considering introducing tougher measures on outdoor smoking in order to reduce the number of tobacco-related deaths.
  - Colum Eastwood announces he will resign as leader of the Social Democratic and Labour Party, triggering a leadership election.
- 30 August –
  - A review is launched into Starmer's appointments of Labour donors to senior civil service jobs following allegations of cronyism.
  - Conservative MP Esther McVey is criticised as "repugnant" by Jewish groups for sharing part of "First They Came", Martin Niemoller's 1946 poem about the Holocaust, in a tweet voicing her opposition to proposed new bans on outdoor smoking. McVey insists she was not equating the bans with Nazi persecution of the Jews, and says "no offence was ever intended".
  - It is reported that Starmer has moved a portrait of Margaret Thatcher from her former 10 Downing Street study to elsewhere in the building. He subsequently says that he moved the portrait because he "didn’t want a picture of anyone" in his study and prefers landscapes.
  - 2024 Ulster Unionist Party leadership election: After nominations close, Mike Nesbitt is the only candidate to put their name forward, and will be ratified as the party's next leader at a meeting on 14 September.
  - During a closed-door session at the SNP Party Conference, leader John Swinney tells delegates the party's losses at the election occurred because it spent too much time focusing on the "process of independence". The comments are recorded and leaked to The Times, which publishes them the following day.

=== September ===
- 1 September –
  - Labour MP Jas Athwal sacks the letting agent managing his properties after a BBC investigation found they were infested with mould and ants.
  - John Swinney gives his keynote speech to the SNP Annual Conference, saying that he will put the "people's priorities" at the heard of the Scottish Government, and that he will work to convince voters that Scottish independence is the "route" to delivering a fairer and stronger country.
  - 2024 Social Democratic and Labour Party leadership election: Claire Hanna, the MP for Belfast South and Mid Down, confirms her intention to run as SDLP leader.
- 2 September –
  - 2024 Conservative Party leadership election: Kemi Badenoch launches her leadership campaign with a speech in central London during which she says the Conservatives need to "stop acting like Labour".
  - Former Labour Party leader Jeremy Corbyn unites with four other independent MPs to create the Independent Alliance, a pro-Gaza group and the joint fifth largest group in Parliament.
- 3 September –
  - The Medicines (Gonadotrophin-Releasing Hormone Analogues) (Emergency Prohibition) (England, Wales and Scotland) Order 2024 ceases to have effect.
  - A leaked letter penned by Cabinet Secretary Simon Case describes the previous Conservative government's failure to hold a spending review in its final years in office as a contributing factor towards uncertainty over the state of public finances. Case also disputes the Conservative stance that Labour's allegation that they have inherited an economic "black hole" is bringing the civil service into disrepute.
  - 2024 Conservative Party leadership election: Tom Tugendhat launches his leadership bid, and says he would take the UK out of the European Convention on Human Rights if he could not reform it.
  - In a statement to the Scottish Parliament, Finance Secretary Shona Robison outlines £500m of spending cuts. She argues the cuts are needed because of an additional £800m in financial costs brought about by public sector pay deals, austerity from Westminster, inflation, the COVID-19 pandemic and the Russian invasion of Ukraine.
- 4 September –
  - 2024 Conservative Party leadership election:
    - Former Home Secretary Priti Patel is knocked out of the leadership content in the first round of voting by Conservative MPs.
    - BBC News reports that the 2024 Conservative Party Conference will not have a leader's speech from Rishi Sunak, but will instead be dedicated to showcasing its leadership candidates.
  - The Scottish Government abandons an unfulfilled commitment to expand free school meals to all primary school pupils.
- 5 September –
  - The UK government sets out its plan to abolish hereditary peers in the House of Lords.
  - The Northern Ireland Executive agrees a draft programme of government, seven months after the return of Stormont.
- 6 September –
  - BBC News reports that Estonia's justice minister, Liisa Pakosta, discussed the possibility of housing foreign prisoners, including those from the UK, in one of its prisons with UK Justice Minister Shabana Mahmood at an AI summit in Vilnius the previous day.
  - Pallavi Devulapalli, health spokesperson for the Green Party of England and Wales, is suspended for calling reports of LGBTQ hate crime "mischievous" and saying she is "yet to meet anyone" who denied a person's right to "dress" and "be addressed as they please".
- 7 September –
  - In a joint article published by The Financial Times, Sir Richard Moore, the chief of MI6, and William Burns, the director of the CIA, warn that the world is "under threat in a way we haven't seen since the Cold War".
  - United Kingdom–Ireland relations: Keir Starmer travels to Ireland and meets Taoiseach Simon Harris, becoming the first British prime minister to visit Ireland for five years. He describes the occasion as a chance to reset the UK's relationship with Ireland.
  - Former First Minister of Wales Vaughan Gething confirms he will not stand for re-election at the 2026 Senedd election.
- 8 September – Stephen Farry resigns as Deputy Leader of the Alliance Party, triggering a deputy leadership election.
- 9 September –
  - Starmer chairs the inaugural meeting of a group dedicated to tackling knife crime, made up of police officers, figures from technology companies and the families of victims of knife crime. They are also joined by actor Idris Elba, who has campaigned against knife crime.
  - Stormont unveils its Programme for Government, a document titled Our Plan: Doing What Matters Most, which sets out nine "immediate priorities" to be worked on for the duration of the government. A public consultation on the document is also launched.
- 10 September –
  - MPs vote 348–228 to restrict winter fuel payments to pensioners receiving Pension Credit.
  - 2024 Conservative Party leadership election: Mel Stride is eliminated from the leadership contest in the second round of voting.
- 11 September –
  - The Scottish Government loses a non-binding vote calling for the rollout of free school meals to all primary school pupils, with MSPs voting 64–2 for the motion.
  - First Minister of Wales Eluned Morgan carries out her first cabinet reshuffle, which includes appointing Jeremy Miles as Health Minister and Mark Drakeford as finance minister.
- 12 September – 2024 Alliance Party deputy leadership election: Alliance's party executive meeting will set the timescale for election of a new deputy leader.
- 13 September –
  - Starmer visits the White House to hold talks with US president Joe Biden.
  - The Green Party of England and Wales is ordered to pay £90,000 in compensation after former deputy leader Shahrar Ali won a discrimination case against them.
- 14 September –
  - Former Conservative immigration minister Timothy Kirkhope says he "regrets" his government's "Stop the Boats" rhetoric, which he believes helped to inflame the 2024 United Kingdom riots.
  - UEFA warns the UK government that Britain could be prevented from hosting Euro 2028 over plans for a football regulator (outlined in the Football Governance Bill) because of concerns about "government interference" in the sport.
- 15 September – The Sunday Times reports that Starmer may have broken parliamentary rules by failing to declare clothes bought for his wife, Victoria, by Labour donor Lord Waheed Alli.
- 16 September –
  - Downing Street confirms that the Parliamentary Commissioner on Standards will not investigate whether Starmer broke parliamentary rules by not declaring a gift of clothes for his wife.
  - The Welsh Government scraps plans to force parties in the Senedd to ensure 50% of their candidates are women.
- 18 September –
  - Liberal Democrat leader Ed Davey unveils an expanded 33-member frontbench team following the party's gains at the general election.
  - Former prime minister Sir John Major criticises the Sunak government's Rwanda asylum plan, describing it as "un-Conservative and un-British".
  - Ofcom announces it will not investigate Ed Balls' interview with his wife, Home Secretary Yvette Cooper, on Good Morning Britain on 5 August despite receiving over 16,000 viewer complaints. ITV chief executive Dame Carolyn McCall defends the interview's impartiality, but says the broadcaster would not do it again.
- 20 September – Downing Street confirms that Keir Starmer, Angela Rayner and Rachel Reeves will no longer accept donations for clothing following controversy over gifts given to Starmer's wife.
- 22–25 September – The 2024 Labour Party Conference is scheduled to take place at the ACC Liverpool.
- 24 September –
  - Starmer gives his keynote conference speech, setting out plans for "national renewal" but telling delegates there are no "easy answers".
  - Starmer pledges to give all veterans, young care leavers and victims of domestic abuse a "guaranteed roof over their head".
  - Senedd members vote to withdraw proposals to require parties to ensure 50% of their candidates are women.
- 25 September –
  - Unions win a nonbinding vote at the Labour Party Conference calling on the government to reverse its cuts to winter fuel payments.
  - Former Conservative MP and government minister Michael Gove is appointed as editor of The Spectator, and will take up the post in early October.
  - Conservative Senedd member Natasha Asghar is reprimanded by Senedd authorities for calling Wales' 20 mph speed limit a "blanket" policy on social media, while signing off a report advising her party to refrain from using the term.
- 26 September –
  - Starmer and Foreign Secretary David Lammy hold their first meeting with Donald Trump, attending a two-hour dinner with the Republican presidential candidate in New York.
  - Former Conservative Party chairwoman Baroness Saeeda Warsi resigns from the party in the House of Lords, saying it has lurched to the "far-right".
- 27 September –
  - 2024 Scottish Conservatives leadership election: Russell Findlay is elected as the new leader of the Scottish Conservatives, succeeding Douglas Ross.
  - The Senedd Commission forecasts it will need an extra £1.2m in 2025–26 to prepare for a larger Senedd at the 2026 election.
- 28 September –
  - Rosie Duffield, MP for Canterbury, resigns from the Labour Party, citing what she describes as it "cruel" policies and Keir Starmer's "staggering hypocrisy" over his acceptance of gifts. In her resignation letter to Starmer she said, "The sleaze, nepotism and apparent avarice are off the scale. I am so ashamed of what you and your inner circle have done to tarnish and humiliate our once proud party".
  - Charles III marks the 25th anniversary of the establishment of the Scottish Parliament at an event in Edinburgh.
  - Rachael Hamilton is appointed deputy leader of the Scottish Conservatives.
  - 2024 Ulster Unionist Party leadership election: Mike Nesbitt is confirmed as the UUP's new leader at the party's annual conference.
  - Sinn Féin president Mary Lou McDonald tells her party's annual conference in the Republic of Ireland that the next Irish government will include a Minister for Reunification if Sinn Féin are part of the administration.
- 29 September –
  - Cabinet Office minister Pat McFadden confirms that ministers will be required to declare hospitality linked to their government posts following weeks of headlines about Starmer and other senior ministers receiving gifts from major Labour donor Lord Alli.
  - The Conservative Party Conference begins in Birmingham, with the first day dominated by a row over comments made by leadership candidate Kemi Badenoch, who said maternity pay had "gone too far". Badenoch says her comments have been "misrepresented" and refer to the broader issue of cutting red tape for businesses.
  - Sunak makes his farewell speech as Conservative Party leader, urging the party to unite behind his successor.
- 30 September – Cabinet Secretary Simon Case, the UK's most senior civil servant, announces he will step down by the end of the year due to health grounds.

=== October ===
- 1 October – In a televised address from Downing Street, Prime Minister Sir Keir Starmer condemns Iran's missile attack on Israel and says that Britain "stand[s] with Israel and ... [recognises] her right to self-defence in the face of this aggression".
- 2 October –
  - Starmer makes his first visit to Brussels as prime minister, where he is attempting to rebuild UK–EU relations.
  - It is reported that Starmer has repaid £6,000 in gifts and hospitality received since becoming prime minister.
  - The Parliamentary Commission on Standards has launched an investigation into Labour peer Lord Alli over allegations of failing to register interests.
- 3 October –
  - The UK announces that it will give up sovereignty of the Chagos Islands to Mauritius, subject to finalisation of a treaty.
  - BBC presenter Laura Kuenssberg cancels a scheduled televised interview with Boris Johnson after accidentally sending him her briefing notes.
  - Labour MP Kim Leadbeater announces plans to introduce a bill on assisted dying after earlier being selected to put forward a private member's bill.
- 4 October –
  - GB News loses a High Court challenge against Ofcom in which it hoped to temporarily block the regulator from sanctioning it over its People's Forum programme featuring Rishi Sunak in February, while Sunak was prime minister. GB News is given permission to challenge the ruling, with Ofcom agreeing to hold off publication of its findings until the case is heard.
  - A blue plaque is installed at a branch of Tesco in Walthamstow to mark the October 2022 purchase of the Liz Truss lettuce, which famously outlived her premiership.
- 6 October – After what The Guardian describes as "months of sniping and criticism" of her, including that her salary was £3,000 higher than that of the prime minister, Sue Gray resigns as Downing Street Chief of Staff. In her resignation statement, Gray says she "risked becoming a distraction". Morgan McSweeney, a person with whom Gray is said to have disagreed in government, is chosen by Starmer to replace her.
- 7 October –
  - Foreign Secretary David Lammy says that the UK's decision to relinquish sovereignty of the Chagos Islands does not mean it has changed its position on the sovereignty of other overseas territories, such as the Falkland Islands and Gibraltar.
  - Chagossians opposed to the government's decision to hand sovereignty of the Chagos Islands to Mauritius protest outside Parliament. Chagossians living in the UK complain that they were not consulted on the decision, with one saying "We don’t have a say, it’s as if we don’t count. We are just like their puppets. Where are our human rights?".
- 8 October – 2024 Conservative Party leadership election: Tom Tugendhat is eliminated from the leadership race in the latest round of voting, leaving three candidates to go forward to the next round.
- 9 October –
  - 2024 Conservative Party leadership election: James Cleverly is knocked out of the leadership race, leaving Kemi Badenoch and Robert Jenrick to through to the final round, with the new leader chosen in a ballot of party members.
  - Leena Sarah Farhat, a member of Llanfairfechan Town Council, is suspended by the Liberal Democrats after sharing a social media post that appeared to celebrate the 7 October attacks.
- 10 October –
  - Starmer holds talks with Ukraine president Volodymyr Zelensky in Downing Street as Zelensky seeks ongoing support for the war against Russia.
  - Starmer chairs the inaugural meeting of the Council of the Nations and Regions in Edinburgh, bringing together the leaders of the UK's devolved nations and regional mayors.
  - Steve Davies, a former councillor with Ceredigion County Council and Aberystwyth Town Council, is disqualified from holding public office for three years after sending unwanted love letters and gifts to a number of women.
- 11 October – At the Plaid Cymru Annual Conference, the party's four Westminster MPs back a motion calling for a sporting and economic boycott of Israel over the war in Gaza.
- 12 October – Plaid Cymru votes to adopt the motion calling for a sporting and economic boycott of Israel.
- 13 October –
  - Flags are lowered to half-mast at the Scottish Parliament following the death of former First Minister Alex Salmond the previous day.
  - MSP John Mason is expelled from the SNP after posting on Twitter that there was "no genocide" in Gaza.
- 14 October –
  - David Lammy becomes the first UK Foreign Secretary to attend a meeting of EU foreign ministers since Brexit as part of Labour's wish to "reset" the UK's relationship with the EU.
  - Monarchists in Australia have criticised a decision by the country's state premieres to be absent from a reception held by Charles III when he visits the country later in the month, describing it as a snub.
- 16 October – The Assisted Dying Bill is introduced into Parliament, criticised by Archbishop of Canterbury Justin Welby as "dangerous" and a "slippery slope".
- 17 October –
  - Former Conservative MP Craig Mackinlay is formally introduced into the House of Lords as Lord Mackinlay of Richborough. Now affectionately known as the 'bionic lord', he is the first quadruple amputee to sit in the Lords.
  - 2024 Conservative Party leadership election: Conservative Party leadership candidates Robert Jenrick and Kemi Badenoch take part in a leadership debate on GB News, but Badenoch has turned down an invitation to take part in a Question Time special on BBC One, and a planned online debate organised by The Sun.
- 18 October –
  - King Charles III and Queen Camilla arrive in Australia for their royal tour, Charles's first visit to the country since becoming King.
  - 10 Downing Street says there will be no apology for the UK's role in the transatlantic slave trade when Charles III and Starmer attend the Commonwealth summit in Samoa.
  - Former Daily Record editor Murray Foote announces he is standing down as chief executive of the SNP after 14 months in the post.
- 19 October – The SNP appoints Carol Beattie, a former chief executive of Stirling Council, as interim chief executive following the resignation of Murray Foote.
- 20 October –
  - The UK government announces plans to appoint a minister to oversee the building of HS2, as well as confirming it will not reinstate the route's Birmingham to Manchester leg.
  - The Sunday Times reports that Rushanara Ali has given up responsibility for managing building safety after survivors of the Grenfell tower fire called for her to stand down following an article that highlighted her attendance at the Franco-British Colloque, a conference that brings together senior politicians, civil servants and business leaders.
- 21 October – A Freedom of Information request reveals that Suella Braverman sent government documents to her private email account 127 times while she was Attorney General, potentially breaching the ministerial code.
- 22 October – The Welsh Government pays a £19m tax bill for the environment agency, Natural Resources Wales, following a HM Revenue and Customs investigation into how the agency hired specialist contractors.
  - The UK signs what it has described as a "landmark defence agreement" with Germany.
- 23 October –
  - Charles III and Camilla arrive in Samoa for a state visit, where the King will preside over the 2024 Commonwealth Heads of Government Meeting.
  - The Senedd votes 26–19 to defeat a motion calling for a new law to allow assisted dying in England and Wales.
  - The Parliamentary Commission on Standards finds that Lord Waheed Alli committed four minor breaches in the register of members' interests.
- 24 October –
  - Chancellor Rachel Reeves announces the UK government is to change its self-imposed debt rules in order to make an extra £50bn available for spending at the forthcoming budget.
  - Lee Waters announces he will step down from the Senedd at the 2026 election.
- 26 October –
  - Commonwealth leaders agree the "time has come" for a conversation about reparations for the slave trade, despite the UK's wish to keep the topic off the agenda at the Commonwealth Heads of Government Meeting.
  - Buckingham Palace announces that Charles III is expected to return to a "normal" schedule in 2025 after his trip to the Commonwealth summit proved to be a "perfect tonic".
  - A video emerges that appears to show Mike Amesbury, the MP for Runcorn and Helsby, shouting and swearing at a man who is lying on the ground during an apparent disturbance.
  - Secretary of State for Wales Jo Stevens is accused by the Conservatives of bringing her office into disrepute after recording a political interview on its premises, something which they say breaches the civil service code.
- 28 October – The speaker of the House of Commons, Lindsay Hoyle, reprimands the chancellor, Rachel Reeves, in the Commons for giving information to journalists in the US about the upcoming Budget, in potential contravention of the ministerial code, which expects major government announcements to be made in the Commons before to the news media. Hoyle said the early revelations were a "supreme discourtesy to the House".
- 30 October – October 2024 United Kingdom budget.
- 31 October – 2024 Conservative Party leadership election: Voting closes for the election of the Conservative Party's next leader.

=== November ===
- 2 November – Kemi Badenoch wins the Conservative leadership election, defeating rival Robert Jenrick after securing the support of party members.
- 3 November – Police Scotland say they have received a fresh allegation concerning a non-recent sexual assault against former First Minister of Scotland Alex Salmond.
- 5 November –
  - The Office for Budget Responsibility said that HM Treasury should have disclosed a £9.5bn overspend before the budget in March "by law". A Treasury spokesperson said it had acted "within the law".
  - It is announced that Northern Ireland First Minister Michelle O'Neill will become the first senior Sinn Féin figure to take part in an official Remembrance Sunday ceremony in Belfast, which is scheduled to take place on 10 November.
- 6 November –
  - Following the freebies scandal, Prime Minister Sir Keir Starmer announces a tightening of the rules regarding ministers' acceptance of gifts and hospitality.
  - Starmer congratulates Donald Trump on his election as President of the United States, and says that a strong UK–US relationship is "crucial".
  - John Swinney, the First Minister of Scotland, also offers Trump his congratulations.
  - Kemi Badenoch attends her first Prime Minister's Questions as Leader of the Opposition.
  - Welsh Labour MP Steve Witherden apologises after he was reprimanded for drinking from a carton of milk in the House of Commons.
- 7 November –
  - Foreign Secretary David Lammy dismisses previous criticism of Donald Trump as "old news". He had described Trump as a "tyrant" and "a woman-hating, neo-Nazi-sympathising sociopath". He says he will be able to find "common ground" with the US president-elect.
  - MP for Runcorn and Helsby, Mike Amesbury, is to be charged with common assault, following a police investigation into video footage that appeared to show him punching a man to the ground in the street. Amesbury was suspended from the Labour Party after the video emerged.
- 8 November – Jonathan Powell, a former Chief of Staff to Tony Blair, is appointed as the UK's national security adviser, replacing Sir Tim Barrow.
- 9 November – Former Health Secretary Alan Milburn, who served in the Blair government, is appointed as a non-executive director on the board of the Department of Health.
- 10 November –
  - Treasury minister Darren Jones tells BBC One's Sunday with Laura Kuenssberg the UK government's commitment to Ukraine is "resolute" amid concerns Donald Trump could push the country into giving up territory to Russia once he becomes president.
  - First Minister of Northern Ireland Michelle O'Neill becomes the first senior Sinn Féin figure to take part in an official Remembrance Sunday ceremony, held in Belfast.
- 11 November –
  - The Terminally Ill Adults (End of Life) Bill, which would allow terminally ill people in England and Wales with less than six months to live to seek assistance in ending their lives, with the consent of two doctors and a High Court judge, is published.
  - At the invitation of French president Emmanuel Macron, Starmer travels to France to mark Armistice Day at the Tomb of the Unknown Soldier, then holds talks with Macron to affirm the UK and France's commitment to supporting Ukraine.
- 12 November –
  - Downing Street confirms that Sue Gray will not take up a role as the prime minister's envoy to the nations and regions.
  - The government sends a contingency of 470 delegates to the COP29 climate summit in Azerbaijan, with an estimated carbon dioxide footprint of at least 338 tons. The delegation is reported to comprise 354 government officials or ministers and 116 others including representatives from British overseas territories and crown dependencies, journalists, business figures and policy experts. By comparison, Italy sends 437, the US 405 and France 115.
  - Starmer tells the COP29 climate conference that the UK will aim to reduce its emissions by 8% by 2035.
  - Stephen Flynn, the SNP's leader at Westminster, announces his intention to stand at the 2026 Scottish Parliament election.
  - Former Welsh government legal advisor Mick Antoniw and ex-minister Julie Morgan tell BBC News that subject to being passed at Westminster, the Terminally Ill Adults (End of Life) Bill would require a vote in the Senedd to become legal in Wales.
- 13 November –
  - Health Secretary Wes Streeting orders a review into the potential cost to the NHS of implementing changes to the law regarding assisted dying.
  - A report published by the Electoral Commission reveals that over half the 2024 general election candidates faced some kind of abuse.
- 14 November –
  - Chancellor Rachel Reeves is reported to be planning the "biggest pension reform in decades" by merging council pension schemes into "pension megafunds" hoping they will boost economic growth.
  - In a speech to Mansion House, Andrew Bailey, the governor of the Bank of England, says the UK must "rebuild relations" with the EU "while respecting the decision of the British people" who voted for Brexit.
  - Neil Gray, Scotland's Health and Social Care Secretary, apologises to the Scottish Parliament for not attending a "wider range" of football matches after he used a chauffeur driven vehicle to attend four games at Aberdeen F.C., something he says gave the impression he was acting "more as a fan and less as a minister".
- 15 November –
  - A report by the National Audit Office reveals that the Home Office "cut corners" and made "poor decisions", while under pressure to stop housing migrants in hotels, when it purchased the former HM Prison Northeye for £15m in 2023; the site was derelict and contaminated with asbestos.
  - 10 Downing Street apologises after meat and alcohol were served at a Diwali celebration held there in October.
  - Stephen McCabe resigns as leader of Inverclyde Council after appearing in court charged with assault and threatening behaviour.
  - Northern Ireland Communities Minister Gordon Lyons attends a football match between Northern Ireland and Belarus despite UK government guidance that the game should not go ahead because of sanctions against Belarus over its stance over the Ukraine War.
  - The Parliamentary Commissioner for Standards launches an investigation into Democratic Unionist Party MP Sammy Wilson for an alleged breach of lobbying rules after he failed to declare an interest when tabling a question on the Turkish Republic of Northern Cyprus, and following a visit to the area.
- 16 November –
  - The SNP's National Executive Committee proposes cutting the number of staff at its headquarters from 26 to 16.
  - Ruth Maguire, MSP for Cunninghame South, announces she will not seek re-election at the 2026 Scottish Parliament election because she is to undergo treatment for cancer.
  - Protesters gather outside Welsh Labour's party conference to oppose changes to inheritance tax for farmers outlined in the October budget as Prime Minister Sir Keir Starmer defends the government's changes.
- 17 November – Sir Ed Davey, the leader of the Liberal Democrats, says that Jane Dodds, who leads the party in Wales, should reflect on her position after a report found she made a "grave error of judgement" in her handling of a sexual abuse scandal when she worked for the Church of England.
- 18 November – At the 2024 G20 Rio de Janeiro summit, Starmer holds talks with Chinese president Xi Jimping and emphasises the importance of a "strong UK–China relationship" for both countries.
- 19 November –
  - Scottish Labour leader Anas Sarwar says his party will expand the eligibility for winter fuel payments in Scotland if they win the 2026 Scottish Parliament election.
  - First Minister of Wales Eluned Morgan offers Plaid Cymru an open invitation to support the Welsh Government's budget, scheduled to be delivered by Finance Secretary Mark Drakeford on 10 December.
  - Wales's health secretary, Jeremy Miles announces that private healthcare will be used to help reduce the patient backlog in the NHS, with £50m allocated for health to be given to Wales's health boards to provide more appointments, tests and treatments.
- 20 November – Peter Kyle, the Secretary of State for Science, Innovation and Technology, tells the BBC that a ban on social media for under-16s in the UK is "on the cards".
- 21 November – Stephen Flynn, the SNP's leader at Westminster, says he will not seek a dual mandate by standing for the Scottish Parliament while he remains an MP.
- 22 November –
  - Downing Street indicates that Israeli prime minister Benjamin Netanyahu would face arrest if he travelled to the UK following the issuing of an international arrest warrant for war crimes by the International Criminal Court.
  - Former prime minister Gordon Brown publicly declares his opposition to a new law on assisted dying.
- 23 November –
  - The UK government advertises for a new negotiator which it hopes will deliver a "reset" of the UK's relationship with the European Union.
  - Secretary of State for Justice Shabana Mahmood writes to her constituents saying she is "profoundly concerned" about the Terminally Ill Adults (End of Life) Bill, not only for religious reasons but because of what it would mean for the state if one of its roles became helping people to die. She also describes the legislation as a "slippery slope towards death on demand".
- 24 November – Alex Cole-Hamilton, the leader of the Scottish Liberal Democrats says his party will vote down the Scottish Government's upcoming budget if it contains even a "penny" promoting Scottish independence.
- 25 November –
  - In an attempt to reassure industry there will not be further tax rises for business, Chancellor Rachel Reeves tells the CBI conference she is "not coming back with more borrowing or more taxes".
  - An online petition calling for another general election reaches two million signatures, the third largest since 2010; in response, Starmer says he is "not that surprised" that people who did not vote for Labour would want an election re-run.
  - South Wales politicians, including MP Sir Chris Bryant and MS Heledd Fychan, have criticised what they describe as a lack of preparation and insufficient warnings ahead of the arrival of Storm Bert.
  - The Welsh Government publishes the Levy and Registration bill to allow councils in Wales to raise a tax from visitor accommodation, with the £1.25 per person per night levy expected to be introduced from 2027.
- 27 November –
  - The UK government announces an overhaul of gambling laws, which will restrict the amount people can bet online with each bet to £5 for those aged over 25 and £2 for those aged 18 to 24.
  - A Parliamentary Commission for Standards investigation is launched into Birmingham Yardley MP and Home Office minister Jess Phillips after she failed to register an interest on time.
  - Conservative leader Kemi Badenoch outlines her party's immigration policy, which reaffirms its commitment to a "strict migration cap"; she also says that her party got it "wrong" on immigration while in government.
  - MPs will debate an online petition calling for a re-run of the 2024 general election in Westminster Hall, a secondary debating chamber, on 6 January 2025 after the petition attracted 2.8 million signatures.
- 28 November –
  - Former prime minister David Cameron announces his support for an assisted dying law in the UK.
  - Transport Secretary Louise Haigh reveals that she pleaded guilty to falsely saying a mobile phone had been stolen during a mugging before she became an MP and was given an absolute discharge by magistrates.
  - Unite the Union announces plans to proceed with a legal challenge to overturn the UK government's cuts to Winter Fuel Payments.
  - The Scottish Government announces that all pensioner households will receive a Winter Fuel Payment from Winter 2025–26, with those on Pension Credit receiving £200 or £300 dependent on age and the rest receiving £100.
  - Former Conservative MP Andrea Jenkyns defects to Reform UK, and announces plans to run as Mayor of Greater Lincolnshire in May 2025.
  - BBC News Wales reports that Senedd Conservatives will hold a vote of confidence in Welsh Conservative leader Andrew RT Davies on 3 December following a series of criticisms about his leadership.
  - Mauritian prime minister Navin Ramgoolam asks for an independent review of the UK's deal with his country over sovereignty of the Chagos Islands.
- 29 November –
  - MPs vote 330 to 275 in favour of proposals to allow assisted dying in England and Wales. The bill passes the first stage in the Commons but will be followed by months of parliamentary activity before needing the approval of both houses of parliament for it become law.
  - Louise Haigh resigns as Secretary of State for Transport after a past fraud offence comes to light. She is replaced by Heidi Alexander.

=== December ===
- 2 December –
  - Sir Chris Wormald is appointed as the new Cabinet Secretary and Head of the Civil Service, succeeding Simon Case, and will take up the role later in December.
  - The Ministry of Defence begins a week-long series of war games to "stress test" how the United Kingdom's military resources would cope in the event of war. It is the first such exercise to involve representatives of the defence industry, alongside military commanders and officials.
  - Addressing the Lord Mayor's Banquet, Prime Minister Keir Starmer rejects any suggestion that the UK must choose between closer ties with the EU and the US when Donald Trump becomes president.
- 3 December –
  - The Financial Times reports that South Western Railway would become the first rail operator to be renationalised when its franchise expires after Parliament passed the Passenger Railway Services (Public Ownership) Act 2024 the previous week.
  - Andrew RT Davies resigns as leader of the Welsh Conservatives shortly after narrowly surviving a vote of confidence by Senedd members by nine votes to seven.
  - Kevin Craig, who was suspended as Labour's election candidate for Central Suffolk and North Ipswich after placing a bet that he would lose, is cleared of wrongdoing by the Gambling Commission.
  - A proportional representation bill to replace first-past-the-post introduced by Liberal Democrat Sarah Olney passes on a symbolic vote.
  - Scottish Labour leader Anas Sarwar blames an "administrative mess" after one of his party's newly elected councillors was disqualified from the job. Mary McNab won a by-election in Glasgow on 22 November, but failed to comply with legislation requiring her to stand down from her Glasgow City Council job the next working day.
  - A Second World War veteran who has moved to Canada says she is "angry" and "heartbroken" after a meeting with minister Emma Reynolds regarding the freezing of pensions for some pensioners who now live overseas.
  - Charities call for urgent support from both the UK and Scottish governments to prevent public services from collapse.
- 4 December –
  - The Organisation for Economic Co-operation and Development (OECD) has forecast that UK interest rates will fall less quickly over the next two years because of the budget.
  - Secretary of State for Housing, Communities and Local Government Angela Rayner insists that councils must meet the government's housing target after local authorities called them impossible to meet.
  - Secretary of State for Transport Heidi Alexander announces that South Western Railway, c2c and Abellio Greater Anglia would be nationalised by autumn 2025 pending new legislation.
  - Defence minister Alistair Carns says that British Armed Forces could be wiped out in six months if they were forced to fight a war on the scale of the Ukraine conflict.
  - The former prime minister, Boris Johnson, accuses Starmer of misleading the House of Commons and says he should correct the record immediately. This follows an exchange in the House during PMQs when Starmer, answering a question from the leader of the opposition, Kemi Badenoch, said that "two of her predecessors had convictions for breaking the Covid rules". Although the former Conservative prime ministers, Johnson and Rishi Sunak had received fixed penalty notices for breaking Covid-19 regulations, neither had any criminal convictions.
  - Scottish Finance Secretary Shona Robison delivers the 2024 budget, which includes planned changes to taxation and a pledge to scrap the two child benefit cap in Scotland.
  - Welsh Conservative leader Andrew RT Davies tells BBC News Wales there has been "plotting" among Conservative Senedd members to oust him since April.
  - Secretary of State for Northern Ireland Hilary Benn begins the process of repealing the controversial Legacy Act.
  - 27-year-old Sam Smith is announced as the new leader of Nottinghamshire County Council.
  - Karen Kilgour, leader of Newcastle City Council, faces a vote of no confidence.
- 5 December –
  - Starmer delivers a major speech in which he sets out six objectives which he says "give the British people the power to hold our feet to the fire"; the objectives cover the economy, housebuilding, the NHS, policing, pre-school education and green energy.
  - Questions are raised over whether Henry Tufnell, the MP for Mid and South Pembrokeshire, gave his parents advanced knowledge of plans to change inheritance tax rules after they transferred ownership of farm land to one of their sons days before the budget.
  - Darren Millar is elected unopposed as leader of the Welsh Conservatives following the resignation of Andrew RT Davies.
- 6 December –
  - Keir Starmer becomes the third UK prime minister to attend a meeting of the British-Irish Council in 17 years.
  - First Minister of Scotland John Swinney and Prime Minister Keir Starmer hold private talks about the Scottish Government's plans to scrap the two child benefit cap, which are later described as "helpful".
  - Labour MPs Jeevun Sandher and Louise Jones announce their engagement.
  - Dave Penman, general secretary of the FDA union, accuses the prime minister of using "Trumpian language" in his criticism of the civil service.
  - The Labour leader of Bolsover District Council, Steve Fritchley, is cleared over accusations of homophobia.
  - Conservative peer Lord Rami Ranger is stripped of his CBE after a report by the Parliamentary Commission for Standards found he harassed and bullied a journalist via social media.
- 7 December – Prince William meets US president-elect Donald Trump for talks while visiting France to attend the reopening of Notre-Dame Cathedral.
- 8 December –
  - Prime Minister Sir Keir Starmer welcomes the Fall of the Assad regime in Syria, which he describes as "barbaric", and calls for the restoration of "peace and stability".
  - Scottish Labour suspends Cammy Day, the leader of Edinburgh City Council, pending the outcome of a police investigation into alleged inappropriate behaviour.
- 9 December –
  - In a speech to European finance leaders in Brussels, Chancellor Rachel Reeves says that closer relations between the UK and the European Union will boost economic growth.
  - The UK and German governments agree a new deal aimed at prosecuting those who smuggle migrants.
  - Cammy Day confirms he has stepped down as leader of Edinburgh City Council after Police Scotland launched an investigation into allegations he bombarded Ukrainian refugees with questions, including those of a sexual nature.
- 10 December –
  - A Scottish Government spokesman confirms that First Minister John Swinney has spoken by phone with US president-elect Donald Trump for the first time since his re-election, and described the 20 minute discussion as "positive".
  - The Scottish Government backs plans to bar dual mandates – MSPs who also sit as MPs or members of the House of Lords – from sitting at Holyrood after the 2026 Scottish Parliament election.
- 10 December – The Stormont Assembly debates Northern Ireland's post-Brexit trade agreement, and votes to extend it for a further four years.
  - Billionaire property developer and former Conservative donor Nick Candy is appointed as Reform UK's treasurer.
- 11 December – A Parliamentary committee is established to examine the Terminally Ill Adults (End of Life) Bill.
- 12 December –
  - The House of Lords Conduct Committee recommends Conservative peer Baroness Meyer should be suspended for three weeks for calling a peer of Indian origin "Lord Poppadum" after an investigation found her comments amounted to harassment.
  - Welsh Conservatives leader Darren Millar unveils his Shadow Cabinet.
- 13 December – The UK unveils plans to achieve 95% clean energy by 2030, including giving powers to ministers to have the final say in the approval of onshore windfarms.
- 15 December –
  - Foreign Secretary David Lammy confirms the UK government has had "diplomatic contact" with Hayat Tahrir al-Sham, the Syrian rebel group that overthrew the Assad regime.
  - The UK joins the Comprehensive and Progressive Agreement for Trans-Pacific Partnership (CPTPP), a trade agreement involving several Asian and Pacific countries, including Japan and Australia.
- 16 December – Deputy Prime Minister Angela Rayner outlines proposals to redesign local government, with plans for every region in England to have a directly-elected mayor.
- 17 December –
  - British diplomats have held talks with Hayat Tahrir al-Sham leader Ahmed al-Sharaa (formerly known as Abu Mohammad al-Julani) in Damascus.
  - Education Secretary Bridget Phillipson introduces the Children's Wellbeing and Schools Bill, legislation that will ensure teachers and schools are involved in decisions concerning the safeguarding children in their area, and local authorities the power of intervention if a child's home environment is assessed as unsuitable or unsafe.
  - Work and Pensions Secretary Liz Kendall rejects a parliamentary ombudsman recommendation to pay financial compensation to the estimated 3.6 million women born in the 1950s who were adversely affected by changes to the state pension age back in the 2010s. Starmer says he has taken account of whether it would be right "to impose a further burden on the taxpayer".
  - MSPs vote unanimously in favour of plans to ban dual mandates.
  - Following an external review into the use of messaging services, Scotland's Deputy First Minister, Kate Forbes announces that Scottish Government ministers and staff will be banned from using WhatsApp for official business.
  - Former First Minister of Scotland Humza Yousaf announces he will step down as an MSP at the 2026 Scottish Parliament election.
  - Democracy and Boundary Commission Cymru unveils the names of the 16 constituencies that will make up the enlarged Senedd from 2026, with all but four of them known by exclusively Welsh language names.
  - The Welsh Conservatives reaffirm their commitment to devolution following a social media post by MS Joel James, who said he wanted to get "rid" of the Senedd; the post, in response to the announcement of the constituencies for the 2026 election, was swiftly deleted.
  - Nigel Farage says that Reform UK are in "open negotiations" with US billionaire Elon Musk about him donating to the party after the pair met at Donald Trump's Mar-a-Lago estate in Florida.
- 18 December –
  - Reform UK confirms that Craig Campbell, a party official in Scotland, has been removed from his post after revelations his family has links to Ulster Loyalists and has a relatives who was convicted of murdering a Celtic fan.
  - Police are called to what is described as a heated meeting of Oldham Council.
- 19 December –
  - UK government minister Tulip Siddiq is named in an investigation into allegations her family embezzled up to £3.9bn from infrastructure projects in Bangladesh.
  - Jane Meagher is voted to replace Cammy Day as leader of Edinburgh City Council, and will lead a Labour minority administration.
  - The Stormont Executive agrees to release its draft budget for the 2025/26 financial year for public consultation, with much of the £19bn budget earmarked for health and education.
- 20 December –
  - Labour appoint 30 new peers, including former Downing Street chief of staff Sue Gray, while the Conservatives appoint six, including former deputy prime minister Therese Coffey.
  - Peter Mandelson is appointed as the next UK ambassador to the United States.
- 21 December – US president-elect Donald Trump appoints British TV executive Mark Burnett as the inaugural United States Special Envoy to the United Kingdom.
- 23 December –
  - Sir Keir Starmer holds talks with Ukrainian president Volodymyr Zelenskyy during which they agreed on the "importance of refining" the UK's training of Ukrainian forces to "bolster" Ukraine's defence.
  - Conservative leader Kemi Badenoch says there is no "quick fix" for the Conservative Party following its election loss, and that she will not be rushed into making policy announcements.
- 26 December – The Reform UK website, and its leader, Nigel Farage, have said that party membership has passed the 131,680 declared by the Conservatives. In response, Conservative leader Kemi Badenoch accuses Farage of "manipulating" the publish by publishing "fake" figures and using an automated ticker to falsely inflate membership numbers. The following day, Farage threatens to "take some kind of action in the next couple of days", while the Reform website says the membership figure has increased to above 143,000.
- 27 December – Former Conservative Justice Secretary David Gauke, who is leading a review into sentencing and prison overcrowding, calls for greater use of open prisons in order to ease the pressure on closed category prisons.
- 29 December –
  - Reform UK says it has notched up a further 20,000 members since the Kemi Badenoch row, reaching 150,000 members.
  - Conservative Party allies of Kemi Badenoch reject claims she asked GB News to reduce Nigel Farage's airtime on the channel.
- 30 December –
  - The King and the Prime Minister pay tribute to Jimmy Carter, following the former US president's death at the age of 100.
  - Conor Murphy, a minister in the Northern Ireland Executive, announces he will contest the 2025 Seanad election in the Republic of Ireland for Sinn Féin, saying he will resign as a member of the Stormont Assembly if successful.
  - 2025 New Year Honours: Those from the world of politics recognised in the New Year Honours include Sadiq Khan, Nick Gibb and Andy Street, who receive knighthoods, and Emily Thornberry, who receives a damehood.
- 31 December –
  - Senior Conservatives, including Shadow Home Secretary Chris Philp, have criticised the awarding of a knighthood to Mayor of London Sadiq Khan, describing it as a "reward for failure".
  - The National Archives releases three volumes of 10 Downing Street visitors' books signed by world figures, the first time these have been released. The books cover the years 1970 to 2003.
  - Newly released government files reveal that Tony Blair was urged by senior ministers, including Jack Straw and John Prescott, to delay granting employment rights to citizens from Eastern and Central Europe when the EU expanded in 2004.
  - Darryl Wilson, a councillor of Causeway Coast and Glens Borough Council, resigns from the Ulster Unionist Party following a controversy over the selection for an Assembly seat, and will continue as an independent.

== Publications ==
- 16 April – Ten Years to Save the West by Liz Truss
- 19 September – A Woman Like Me: A Memoir by Diane Abbott
- 10 October – Unleashed by Boris Johnson

== Deaths ==
- 3 January – Derek Draper, 56, lobbyist and political adviser.
- 15 January – James Masih Shera, 77, Pakistani-born British politician and educationist.
- 17 January – Sir Tony Lloyd, 73, British politician, MP (1983–2012, since 2017) and mayor of Greater Manchester (2015–2017), leukemia.
- 19 January – Sir Graham Bright, 81, British politician, MP (1979–1997) and Cambridgeshire police and crime commissioner (2012–2016).
- 20 January – John Tomlinson, Baron Tomlinson, 84, British politician, MP (1974–1979) and MEP (1984–1999).
- 6 February – Shreela Flather, Baroness Flather, 89, British-Indian politician, Life peer (since 1990).
- 23 February – Ronnie Campbell, 80, British politician, MP (1987–2019).
- 25 February – Patrick Cormack, Baron Cormack, 84, British politician, MP (1970–2010) and member of the House of Lords (since 2010). (death announced on this date)
- 26 February – Jacob Rothschild, 4th Baron Rothschild, 87, British investment banker and peer, member of the House of Lords (1991–1999).
- 29 February – Ruth Henig, Baroness Henig, 80, historian and politician, member of the House of Lords (since 2004), Deputy Speaker of the House of Lords (since 2018).
- 8 March – Tommy McAvoy, Baron McAvoy, 80, British politician, MP (1987–2010) and member of the House of Lords (since 2010). (death announced on this date)
- 6 April – Doug Hoyle, Baron Hoyle, 98, British politician, MP (1974–1979, 1981–1983) and member of the House of Lords (1997–2023).
- 10 April – Richard Rosser, Baron Rosser, 79, British trade unionist and politician, member of the House of Lords (since 2004).
- 14 April – Trixie Gardner, Baroness Gardner of Parkes, 96, British politician, member of the House of Lords since 1981
- 20 April – Doreen Massey, Baroness Massey of Darwen, 85, British politician, member of the House of Lords (since 1999).
- 23 April –
  - Frank Field, Baron Field of Birkenhead, 81, British politician, MP (1979–2019) and member of the House of Lords (since 2020).
  - David Marquand, 89, British politician and academic administrator, MP (1966–1977) and principal of Mansfield College, Oxford (1996–2002).
- 29 April – Andrew Stunell, Baron Stunell, 81, British politician, MP (1997–2015) and member of the House of Lords (since 2015).
- 10 May – Colin Breed, 76, British politician, MP (1997–2010). (death announced on this date)
- 12 May – Michael Brudenell-Bruce, 8th Marquess of Ailesbury, 98, British hereditary peer, army officer and stockbroker, member of the House of Lords (1974–1999).
- 5 June – Charles Allsopp, 6th Baron Hindlip, 83, British peer and businessman, member of the House of Lords (1993–1999).
- 26 June – Richard Taylor, 89, British politician, MP (2001–2010).
- 29 July –
  - Robert Fellowes, Baron Fellowes, 82, British courtier, private secretary to the sovereign (1990–1999) and member of the House of Lords (1999–2022).
  - Peter Reddaway, 84, British-American political scientist.
- 4 August – Anthony Hamilton-Smith, 3rd Baron Colwyn, 82, British dentist and peer, member of the House of Lords (1967–2022).
- 22 August – Delwyn Williams, 85, British politician and solicitor, MP (1979–1983).
- 30 August – Nicky Gavron, 82, British politician, deputy mayor of London (2000–2003, 2004–2008).
- 3 September – Flora Fraser, 21st Lady Saltoun, 93, Scottish peer, member of the House of Lords (1979–2014).
- 18 September – Malcolm Mitchell-Thomson, 3rd Baron Selsdon, 86, British peer, banker and businessman, member of the House of Lords (1963–2021).
- 1 October – Michael Ancram, 13th Marquess of Lothian, 79, British politician and peer, three-times MP, member of the House of Lords (since 2010).
- 2 October – Herman Ouseley, Baron Ouseley, 79, Guyanese-born British civil rights activist and politician, member of the House of Lords (2001–2019).
- 4 October – Alexander Leitch, Baron Leitch, 76, British businessman and life peer, member of the House of Lords (since 2004).
- 7 October – Hugh Cholmondeley, 5th Baron Delamere, 90, British peer, member of the House of Lords (1979–1999).
- 12 October – Alex Salmond, 69, Scottish politician, first minister (2007–2014).
- 20 October – Paul White, Baron Hanningfield, 84, British politician and life peer, member of the House of Lords (since 1998).
- 4 November – Robin Renwick, Baron Renwick of Clifton, 86, British diplomat and life peer, ambassador to the United States (1991–1995).
- 6 November –
  - Anna Lo, 74, Northern Irish politician, MLA (2007–2016).
  - Sir John Nott, 92, British politician, MP (1966–1983) and defence secretary (1981–1983).
- 20 November – John Prescott, Baron Prescott, 86, British politician, deputy prime minister (1997–2007), first secretary of state (2001–2007), and MP (1970–2010).
- 24 November – Colin Renfrew, Baron Renfrew of Kaimsthorn, 87, British archaeologist, academic and peer, member of the House of Lords (1991–2021).
- 1 December – Sir Richard Carew Pole, 13th Baronet, 85, British aristocrat.
- 2 December – Rosalie Wilkins, Baroness Wilkins, 78, British politician, member of the House of Lords (1999–2015). (death announced on this date)
- 8 December – Tony Lloyd, Baron Lloyd of Berwick, 95, British jurist, lord of appeal in ordinary (1993–1998), member of the House of Lords (1993–2015).
- 15 December – Andrew Bennett, 85, British politician, MP (1974–2005).
- 18 December – Patrick Conolly-Carew, 7th Baron Carew, 86, Irish equestrian and aristocrat, Member of the House of Lords as a hereditary peer (1994–1999).

== See also ==
- 2024 United Kingdom electoral calendar
