= 2024 in England =

- Centuries: 19th; 20th; 21st
- Decades: 2000s; 2010s; 2020s
- See also: 2023–24 in English football 2024–25 in English football 2024 in the United Kingdom; Other events of 2024

Events of the year 2024 in England.

== Incumbent ==
- Monarch - Charles III
- Prime Minister - Rishi Sunak (until 5 July), Keir Starmer (from 5 July)

== Events ==
=== January ===
- 1 January –
  - Figures published by NHS England show that almost three million people were seen for an urgent cancer check during 2023, a quarter higher than the same period before the COVID-19 pandemic. The treatment statistics fell short of planned targets.
  - A 16-year-old boy who was stabbed to death in Primrose Hill, London, on New Year's Eve, is named by police as Harry Pitman. A 16-year-old boy is arrested in connection with the incident.
  - Sir Martyn Oliver begins his tenure as HM Chief Inspector of Education, Children's Services and Skills. One of his first acts in the role is to announce that Ofsted inspectors will receive training around mental health, following the findings of an inquest into the January 2023 death of headteacher Ruth Perry.
- 2 January –
  - Following a trial at Chester Crown Court, Alice Wood is found guilty of the May 2022 murder of her fiancé, Ryan Watson, whom she dragged under her car following an argument at a party.
  - Birmingham City sack Wayne Rooney as their manager after 83 days in charge, 15 matches and nine consecutive losses.
  - Applications open for working parents in England to apply for 15 hours per week of funded childcare for two-year-olds starting from April 2024.
  - A further two arrests are made in connection with the death of Harry Pitman.
- 3 January –
  - Thousands of junior doctors begin a six-day walkout, the longest strike in NHS history, in a dispute over pay.
  - More than 250 flood warnings remain in place throughout England in the wake of Storm Henk.
- 4 January – Heavy rain continues to cause flooding and disruption to England as waterlogged ground is deluged in the wake of Storm Henk.
- 5 January –
  - Two teenage boys, aged 16 and 17, are arrested on suspicion of murder following the death of Harry Pitman on New Year's Eve.
  - London Underground staff belonging to the RMT union begin a week of strikes after the breakdown of last minute talks.
  - Around 280 flood alerts remain in place in northeast, eastern and southeast England, with rivers bursting their banks and several hundred properties flooded, forcing people to be evacuated.
- 6 January – A 16-year-old boy appears before Highbury Magistrates Court charged with the murder of Harry Pitman, and is remanded in custody.
- 7 January –
  - The RMT union announce that strikes by London Underground workers which would have crippled Tube services for a week commencing 8 January are suspended.
  - The Met Office issues a yellow weather warning for snow and sleet valid from 4am the next day for Greater London and the southeast.
- 9 January – Following a trial at Maidstone Crown Court, Jan Gholami is convicted of the May 2020 murder of his two-year-old adopted daughter Zahra Ghulami.
- 12 January – Following a trial and conviction at Maidstone Crown Court, Sian Hedges and Jack Benham are sentenced to life imprisonment with a minimum of 19 and 23 years respectively for the November 2020 murder of Hedges' 18-month-old son Alfie Phillips.
- 13 January – Residents of social housing properties affected with damp and mould, and owned by Rochdale Boroughwide Housing, report being told by their landlord that they breathe too much.
- 14 January – Transport for London is reported to be testing ways to stop the appearance of "ghost marks" on the walls of stations on the Elizabeth line caused by passengers leaning on the walls.
- 15 January – The English Premier League charges Everton and Nottingham Forest with breaching its financial rules.
- 16 January – The Gender Plus Hormone Clinic is approved by the Care Quality Commission to prescribe hormones for those over the age of 16, becoming the first clinic of its type to receive approval from the CQC.
- 17 January – Lincolnshire County Council launches an inquiry into the death of two-year-old Bronson Battersby, who is believed to have starved to death, after his father, Kenneth, died from a heart attack shortly after Christmas 2023.
- 18 January –
  - The Independent Office for Police Conduct announces an investigation into whether there were "missed opportunities" to check on two-year-old Bronson Battersby and his father before their deaths.
  - Nuneaton Borough F.C. withdraw from Southern League Premier Division Central.
- 19 January –
  - Police issue an urgent appeal to trace the mother of a newborn baby girl who was found abandoned wrapped in a towel inside a shopping bag in Newham, east London, the previous evening.
  - The bodies of a man and woman and two girls are found at a property in Norwich.
  - The High Court in London rules that former Sinn Féin president Gerry Adams can be sued in a personal capacity by victims of IRA bomb attacks in England.
- 20 January –
  - Norfolk Police refers itself to the Independent Office for Police Conduct after it emerges officers did not respond to a 999 call from a house near Norwich where the bodies of a family were discovered.
  - A 17-year-old boy, later named as Muhammad Hassam Ali, is stabbed to death in Birmingham city centre in what police believe to be a case of mistaken identity.
- 21 January – Police investigating the deaths of a family of four near Norwich confirm the two adults died as a result of stab wounds.
- 22 January – NHS England begins contacting millions of parents in England to advise them to get their children vaccinated against measles as cases of the disease increase.
- 23 January – A court accepts Valdo Calocane's plea of manslaughter on the basis of diminished responsibility over the 2023 Nottingham attacks.
- 25 January –
  - Paranoid schizophrenic Valdo Calocane is sentenced to an indefinite detention in a high security hospital for the June 2023 Nottingham stabbings during which he killed three people.
  - Elsa, the baby found abandoned in Newham, London, has been discharged from hospital and placed in foster care, BBC News reports.
  - The British Medical Association announces that senior consultants in England have voted by 51% to reject the UK government's latest pay offer, worth an extra 4.5%. The offer was rejected on a 66% turnout.
- 26 January –
  - A BBC News investigation finds that more than 60 calls were made to police and social services before the death of nine-year-old Alfie Steele, who was killed by his mother and her partner at their home in Droitwich, Worcestershire, in 2021.
  - 2023 Nottingham attacks:
    - The Attorney General's office announces that it will consider a review of Valdo Calocane's sentence following a referral arguing it was too lenient.
    - NHS England announces an investigation into Calocane's contact with mental health services stretching back to 2020.
    - Leicestershire Police confirm that Calocane was reported for assaulting two colleagues six weeks before he stabbed three people to death in Nottingham, but that no arrest was made.
  - An inquest into the March 2021 death of 14-year-old Mia Janin concludes the north London schoolgirl took her own life after being bullied by boys at her school.
- 27 January –
  - The UK's first licensed drug safety checking service is launched by charity The Loop in Bristol.
  - Firefighters tackle a major fire at a four-storey building in Liverpool city centre.
- 28 January –
  - Two boys, aged 15 and 16, die in hospital following a stabbing attack late the previous evening in the Knowle West area of Bristol. A 15-year-old boy and a man, aged 44, are arrested in connection with the incident.
  - An FA Cup match between Wolverhampton Wanderers and West Bromwich Albion is halted for 34 minutes after fighting breaks out between rival supporters at The Hawthorns.
- 29 January –
  - Police in Leeds appeal for a mother of a baby girl found in a pub toilet the previous evening, and who appears to have been stillborn, to contact them. It is reported the following day that the woman has been identified and is receiving medical treatment.
  - Two teenagers who died following a stabbing incident in Bristol are named as Max Dixon, 16, and Mason Rist, 15. A further two arrests are made in connection with the incident.
  - Leicestershire Police refers itself to the Independent Office for Police Conduct over its investigation into two assaults committed by Valdo Calocane weeks before he stabbed three people to death in Nottingham.
- 30 January –
  - A man armed with a crossbow is shot dead by police after trying to break into a house in Surrey Quays in Southwark, southeast London. He is subsequently named as Bryce Hodgson, a convicted stalker who was banned from the road where he was shot.
  - A BBC investigation reveals that three police officers at Thames Valley Police viewed body camera footage of a woman's groin without reason, but did not face a misconduct hearing for doing so, while a student officer was dismissed for reporting the incident. Thames Valley Police has since referred itself to the Independent Office for Police Conduct.
  - Work begins to dismantle an unauthorised spa building at the home of Captain Tom Moore's daughter after she lost an appeal to save it from demolition.
- 31 January –
  - Launch of Pharmacy First, an NHS scheme enabling pharmacists in England to issue prescriptions for seven minor ailments, including sore throats and earache, without the need for a referral from a GP.
  - A further three arrests are made in connection with the fatal stabbing of two teenagers in Bristol. A 44-year-old man is subsequently charged with murder.

=== February ===
- 1 February –
  - It becomes a criminal offence to own an American XL Bully dog in England and Wales unless the owner has successfully applied for the dog to be exempt.
  - A further four people are charged in connection with the fatal stabbings of two teenagers in Bristol.
- 2 February – Alice Wood is sentenced to life imprisonment with a minimum term of 18 years for the murder of her boyfriend, whom she ran over with her car following an argument.
- 3 February – A 68-year-old woman, later named as Esther Martin, dies following an attack by two dogs, believed to be American XL bullies, at Jaywick in Essex.
- 4 February –
  - Police offer a reward of £20,000 for information leading to the arrest of Abdul Ezedi, who remains at large following an acid attack in Clapham on 31 January.
  - A 17-year-old boy becomes the fourth person to be charged with the murder of two teenagers in Bristol.
  - Jockey Keegan Kirkby dies following a fall from the horse he was riding at a race meeting in Kent.
- 5 February – A 14-year-old boy becomes the fifth person to be charged with the murder of two teenagers in Bristol.
- 6 February –
  - Teenagers Abdul Yaro and Kavian Vaughans are sentenced to life imprisonment with a minimum term of 21 years for the murder of 17-year-old Shea Gordon, who was stabbed to death at an 18th birthday party in east London in September 2022.
  - The UK government gives Birmingham City Council the go-ahead to increase its Council Tax by 10% from April.
- 8 February – Analysis carried out by BBC News indicates 2023 was the worst year on record for cancer waiting times in England, with almost 100,000 people not starting treatment within 62 days of a diagnosis.
- 9 February –
  - The BMA announces that junior doctors in England will stage a strike from 24 to 28 February.
  - Authorities in Cumbria confirm that an invasive alligator snapping turtle, native to the southern United States, was found by a dog walker at Urswick Tarn, near Ulverston, a few days earlier.
- 10 February – An eight-year-old boy is taken to hospital after being bitten in the head by a dog, believed to be an XL bully, in Bootle, Merseyside.
- 11 February –
  - The Coventry to Rugby section of the West Coast Main Line is forced to close, disrupting train services between London and the West Midlands, following a landslide that blocked the track. The line reopens again on 13 February.
  - A vigil is held in Warrington, Cheshire, to mark the first anniversary of the murder of transgender teenager Brianna Ghey.
- 12 February – The Independent Office for Police Conduct begins investigating Leicestershire Police's contact with Valdo Calocane prior to the Nottingham stabbings. A probe into Nottinghamshire Police's contact with Calocane is launched the next day.
- 14 February –
  - The High Court upholds a decision against the University of Bristol that it discriminated against student Natasha Abrahart, who committed suicide in 2018 shortly before she was scheduled to take part in a group presentation. Abrahart had chronic social anxiety disorder and a previous hearing had ruled the university had failed to make reasonable adjustments for her.
  - A murder investigation is launched after a 16-year-old boy, subsequently named as Darrian Williams, is stabbed to death by two masked attackers in the Rawnsley Park area of Bristol.
- 15 February –
  - Two 15-year-old boys are arrested on suspicion of murder in Bristol.
  - Parliamentary by-elections are held in the Wellingborough and Kingswood constituencies. In Wellingborough, Labour's Gen Kitchen overturns former Conservative MP Peter Bone's majority of more than 18,000. The swing of 28.5% is the second largest swing from Conservative to Labour at a by-election since the Second World War. In Kingswood, Labour's Damien Egan overturns an 11,220 Conservative majority to win the former seat of Chris Skidmore, who had resigned in protest over his government's relaxation of net zero policies.
  - New names for the lines on the London Overground are announced. From September the six lines will be known as Lioness, Mildmay, Windrush, Weaver, Suffragette and Liberty.
  - Atiqul Hoque, the Conservative Mayor of Salisbury, is expelled from the Conservative Party over antisemitic remarks made on social media and WhatsApp.
- 16 February –
  - NHS England authorises the use of Produodopa, a Parkinson's disease treatment that uses a pump to steadily release medicine into the bloodstream.
  - Six people are taken to hospital after migrants are found in the back of a lorry at Newhaven Ferry Port.
  - Jan Gholami is sentenced to life imprisonment with a minimum term of 23 years and six months for the murder of his two-year-old adoptive daughter Zahra Ghulami.
  - Craig Browne resigns as deputy leader of Cheshire East Council, saying he can no longer afford to do the role on the £30,000 annual salary.
- 17 February –
  - The Met Office issues a yellow weather warning for heavy rain for the East of England, covering Bedfordshire, Buckinghamshire, Cambridgeshire, Essex, Hertfordshire, Norfolk, Northamptonshire and Suffolk.
  - Tens of thousands of protestors attend a Palestine Solidarity Campaign march in central London calling for a ceasefire in Gaza.
  - A murder investigation is launched after a 17-year-old boy is stabbed to death in Hackney, east London.
- 18 February –
  - Two fifteen-year-old boys are charged with the murder of Darrian Williams.
  - A 42-year-old woman is arrested on suspicion of murder after three children are found dead at a property in Bristol.
  - Police begin a search for a two-year-old boy who is missing after falling into the River Soar at Aylestone in Leicester.
- 19 February –
  - The campaign group Save Stonehenge World Heritage Site loses a legal challenge against renewed plans to build a tunnel for the A303 near to Stonehenge.
  - The UK government announces plans for new measures on holiday homes in England to stop local people being priced out of being able to live in their community.
  - Birmingham City Council announces plans to raise council tax by 21% over the next two years as part of £300m in budget cuts.
- 20 February – Attorney General Victoria Prentis announces her intention to refer the sentence of Valdo Calocane for killing three people in Nottingham to the Court of Appeal as unduly lenient.
- 21 February – Bristol City Council approves plans to move a statue of transatlantic slave trader Edward Colston, which had been graffitied and thrown into the Severn by protesters, to the M Shed Museum for permanent display.
- 22 February –
  - A yellow weather warning is in place for many parts of England as heavy rain and high winds affect areas already waterlogged by previous downpours.
  - A man, subsequently named as Lenny Scott, is shot dead while riding his bicycle in Lancashire.
  - NHS England introduces baby loss certificates, which recognize the loss of a baby during pregnancy before 24 weeks.
- 23 February –
  - A 500 kg (1,100 lb) unexploded World War II German bomb found in a garden in Plymouth three days earlier, and that forced the evacuation of thousands of people, is taken out to sea for disposal.
  - Following a trial at Oxford Crown Court, Scarlet Blake, who once livestreamed the killing and dissecting of a cat, is convicted of the July 2021 murder of Jorge Martin Carreno, whom Blake attacked and killed after wandering the streets in search of a murder victim.
- 24 February – Junior doctors in England begin a five-day strike at 7.00am, the tenth time they have walked out during their dispute.
- 26 February – Scarlet Blake is sentenced to life imprisonment with a minimum term of 24 years for the murder of Jorge Martin Carreno.
- 27 February – A man is arrested by police on suspicion of trespassing at Windsor Castle, and subsequently detained under the Mental Health Act.
- 29 February –
  - 2024 Rochdale by-election: In an unusually chaotic by-election, former MP and left-wing firebrand George Galloway resoundingly wins for the Workers Party of Britain, marking his return to parliament. Independent candidate David Tully comes second, with the Conservative candidate Paul Ellison coming third. Both the Labour and Green Party candidates were disowned by their respective parties.
  - BBC News reports that Birmingham's Electric Cinema, the UK's oldest cinema, is closing for the foreseeable future.
  - Manchester's Co-op Live arena, due to open in April, is chosen as the venue for the 2024 MTV Europe Music Awards on 10 November.
  - North Yorkshire Police issues an apology to the LGBTQ+ community for past discrimination following a request by human rights campaigner Peter Tatchell.

=== March ===
- 1 March –
  - Eleven people, including eight police officers, are taken to hospital after fire breaks out at a five-storey building in the Kensington area of London.
  - At the Old Bailey, Ashana Studholme, Lisa Richardson and Shaun Pendlebury are sentenced to life imprisonment with a minimum term of 34 years for the murder of Shakira Spencer.
  - Following a trial at Leeds Crown Court, Marcus Osborne is given a whole life sentence for the May 2023 murders of his ex-partner, Katie Higton, and her new love interest, Steven Harnett.
  - NHS England releases figures indicating that 91,000 appointments had to be rescheduled following the latest strike by junior doctors.
  - Three people are injured during a police chase involving two suspects on a moped in Clapham, southwest London; two women are injured when a gun dropped by one of the suspects discharges, while a member of the public is injured when they are hit by the moped.
- 2 March – Northumberland National Park confirms that part of the felled Sycamore Gap Tree will go on display at The Sill, a venue near the site of the tree, from September.
- 3 March – Train fares in England and Wales are increased by 5%. London bus and Tube fares are frozen until 2025.
- 4 March –
  - A rare Ferrari F512M worth £350,000, which was stolen in London from Formula One driver Gerhard Berger in 1995, is recovered by police.
  - A woman is arrested on suspicion of murder after the discovery of the body of a 10-year-old girl, subsequently named as Shay Kang, at a property in Rowley Regis, West Midlands.
  - One person is taken to hospital following a chemical leak at a factory in the Trafford Park area of Greater Manchester.
- 5 March –
  - The British Medical Association and the Hospital Consultants and Specialists Association provisionally give their backing to an improved pay offer for senior consultants in England and announce they will ballot members to see if they are willing to accept.
  - Birmingham City Council approves major cuts to public services and a 21% rise in council tax over two years after previously declaring itself effectively bankrupt.
- 6 March –
  - A 33-year-old woman is charged with the murder of Shay Kang, and remanded in custody by Wolverhampton magistrates.
  - A major fire at Southampton F.C.'s St Mary's Stadium results in the club's EFL Championship match against Preston North End F.C. being postponed.
- 7 March – North Yorkshire Police arrest an 11-year-old boy who was stopped on the M1 while driving a BMW X5 that was towing a suspected stolen caravan.
- 8 March –
  - Brenda Dacres is elected Mayor of Lewisham, becoming the first black female directly elected mayor in England.
  - Transport for London begins a three-month trial of all-day off-peak travel on Fridays for bus and Tube passengers in an attempt to increase usage and support London's economy.
- 9 March – Humberside Police remove a number of bodies from a funeral home in Kingston upon Hull following a report of concern about "care of the deceased". It is subsequently reported that 35 bodies and a quantity of human ashes were removed.
- 12 March – NHS England announces that children will no longer routinely be prescribed puberty blockers at gender identity clinics.
- 13 March – Following a trial at Leeds Crown Court, Lynda Chenery and Mark Woods are convicted of fraudulently obtaining and reselling concert tickets worth £6.5m.
- 14 March – At the Old Bailey, a 17-year-old boy, on charges of murder, pleads guilty to the manslaughter of 15-year-old Elianne Andam, who was stabbed at a bus stop in Croydon in September 2023. The plea is not accepted by the prosecution, meaning a murder trial will take place in November.
- 15 March –
  - At 9.00pm, a five-mile section of the M25 is closed between Junctions 10 and 11 in Surrey to facilitate the demolition of a bridge and the installation of a new gantry. The section is scheduled to reopen again at 6.00am on 18 March, but opens eight hours earlier than planned, at 10.00pm on 17 March. It is the first daytime closure of a section of the motorway since it was opened in 1986.
  - Liverpool Coroner's Office confirms that Stephen Shrimpton, who collapsed while driving a school bus which subsequently crashed killing a teenage girl in September 2023, died from natural causes.
- 16 March – A group calling itself the South Devon Primary, which aims to unseat Conservative MPs in South Devon at the next election, chooses Liberal Democrat Caroline Voaden as a candidate for one of its constituencies.
- 18 March – Four people are injured following an attack by a suspected American XL bully dog in Battersea, South London.
- 19 March – The Football Governance Bill, which aims to establish an independent football regulator for England, is introduced into Parliament.
- 20 March – Junior doctors in England vote in favour of continuing their industrial action for a further six months, with 98% of the 62% of respondents voting to continue the dispute.
- 21 March –
  - Following a 17-day trial at Newcastle Crown Court, Christina Robinson is found guilty of the murder of her son Dwelaniyah Robinson in November 2022, whom she scalded and beat.
  - Dan Barker, selected in December 2023 as the Conservative candidate for the 2024 Greater Manchester mayoral election, defects to Reform UK, accusing the Conservatives of giving up on northern England.
  - At Leicester Crown Court, Shannon Grant is sentenced to life imprisonment with a minimum term of 34 years for the June 2023 torture and murder of Natasha Morais at his home in Leicester.
  - At Warwick Crown Court, three teenagers − two boys and a girl − are given custodial sentences of between nine and twelve months after pleading guilty to the manslaughter of a man who was walking his dog in Nuneaton.
- 22 March –
  - At Chelmsford Crown Court, Luke D'Wit is sentenced to life imprisonment with a minimum term of 37 years for the April 2023 murders of Stephen and Carol Baxter, whom he poisoned with fentanyl before rewriting their will.
  - A 12-year-old boy is arrested after a teenage girl was stabbed during an incident in Sittingbourne, Kent. He is subsequently charged with attempted murder.
- 24 March – Mayor of London Sadiq Khan rules out any changes to the Ultra Low Emission Zone while he is in office.
- 25 March –
  - Following a trial at Birmingham Crown Court, Remy Gordon and Kami Carpenter are convicted of the murder of footballer Cody Fisher, who was stabbed at a nightclub in Birmingham on 26 December 2022.
  - A review into the Valdo Calocane case finds that prosecutors were right to accept his plea of manslaughter on the grounds of diminished responsibility, but that they could have handled the case better.
- 27 March –
  - Participants in the 2024 Boat Races, scheduled to take place on 30 March, are being warned not to enter the River Thames after high levels of E. coli bacteria were found in the water. It is believed the bacteria comes from a discharge of raw sewage.
  - A man in his 20s is stabbed on a train in Beckenham, southeast London, sustaining life-threatening injuries. A 19-year-old man is subsequently arrested and charged with attempted murder.
- 28 March – At Stafford Crown Court, four men are convicted of the murder in August 2023 of DPD driver Aurman Singh in Shrewsbury. A fifth man is convicted of manslaughter.

=== April ===
- 1 April –
  - The Royal College of Emergency Medicine releases an analysis of NHS data suggesting that as many as 250 patients in England could be unnecessarily dying each week because of A&E waiting times.
  - Parents in England become eligible to access 15 hours of free childcare each week.
  - A murder investigation is launched following the fatal shooting of a 21-year-old man in west London.
- 4 April –
  - Data produced by the Nuffield Trust indicates an increase in demand for assessments for autism and treatment for ADHD has surpassed the ability of NHS England to meet demand.
  - A murder investigation is launched following the discovery of a human torso in woodland at Kersal, Greater Manchester. The torso is later described as that of a man who is "likely to be aged older than 40" and had "only been deceased for a matter of days".
- 5 April –
  - Senior consultants belonging to the British Medical Association (BMA) and the Hospital Consultants and Specialists Association (HCSA) vote to accept a pay offer from the UK government worth almost 20% for 2023–24, thus ending their dispute.
  - At the Old Bailey, student Adele Okojie-Aidonojie is sentenced to 11 years in prison for causing death by dangerous driving after a couple who were twerking in the back of her car as it was speeding were thrown from the vehicle in a crash in Battersea, south London in July 2022.
- 6 April – West Yorkshire Police launch a murder investigation regarding a 27-year-old woman who died after being stabbed in Bradford city centre while she was pushing a baby in a pram. She is subsequently named as Kulsuma Akter.
- 8 April – Remy Gordon and Kami Carpenter are sentenced to life imprisonment with minimum terms of 26 years and 25 years respectively for the murder of Cody Fisher in December 2022.
- 10 April –
  - Michael Davis is sentenced to life imprisonment with a minimum term of 22 years for the murder of his baby son, Ollie Davis, in 2017.
  - A 25-year-old man is charged with the murder of Kulsama Akter. He is subsequently remanded in custody the following day by Bradford magistrates.
  - Omar Edwards is sentenced to five months in prison for "abusive and violent behaviour" towards cabin crew after he was asked to stop vaping in the toilets of a flight from Jamaica to London in November 2022.
- 11 April –
  - Data published by NHS England for March 2024 shows targets for the number of people seen in A&E within four hours were not met, falling below the 76% threshold, while a separate target to eliminate all waiting times over 65 weeks by March is pushed back until September.
  - After South East England is hit by Storm Pierrick, the waves at Dunster Beach in Somerset turn pink as sediment from the red sandstone cliffs are churned up by rough seas.
- 12 April –
  - At Truro Crown Court, Jake Hill is sentenced to life imprisonment with a minimum term of 28 years for the murder of Michael Riddiough-Allen, who was stabbed outside a nightclub in Bodmin, Cornwall, on 30 April 2023.
  - At Kingston Crown Court, four men are given prison sentences of between 13 and 26 years for a drive-by shooting outside a church in which two children and four women were injured.
- 13 April –
  - Greater Manchester Police arrest five people after the discovery of the remains of a baby at a property in Wigan; the five are subsequently released on bail.
  - Mayor of London Sadiq Khan launches what he describes as a "new climate action plan" for London, which includes a Net Zero Schools target and recommitting to making London Net Zero by 2030.
  - Seventeen people are taken to hospital after a minibus carrying South Shields F.C. fans home from a match with Tamworth F.C. crashes on the A1(M) near Pontefract in West Yorkshire.
- 14 April – Three men are killed in a car crash at Staples Corner Retail Park in north London after their car rolls down an embankment and strikes a footbridge.
- 16 April –
  - A woman is remanded in custody by magistrates in Warrington charged with the murder of a baby whose body was found in Warrington in March 1998.
  - Flight operations at Birmingham Airport are temporarily suspended following a security incident on an Aer Lingus jet.
- 17 April –
  - Sussex Police apologise to the families of the 1986 Babes in the Wood murder victims over the way they handled the investigation.
  - Mohammed Abbkr, who has schizophrenia and set two people on fire as they walked home from mosques in Birmingham and London, is sentenced to an indefinite hospital order after he was convicted of attempted murder in November 2023.
- 18 April – The Criminal Cases Review Commission issues an "unreserved apology" to Andrew Malkinson, who spent 17 years in prison after being wrongfully convicted of rape.
- 19 April –
  - Greater Manchester Police launch an investigation after a number of films of women on nights out in northwest England were taken without their knowledge and posted on social media.
  - Myra Carvalho, who sent the singer Harry Styles 8,000 cards in less than a month, is sentenced to 14 weeks in prison at Harrow Crown Court, and given a ten-year restraining order that prevents her from attending any events where he is performing.
- 23 April –
  - Six people are arrested after trouble at a St George's Day event in central London.
  - The Unite union announces that 800 of its staff at Heathrow Airport will stage a strike from 7 to 13 May over outsourcing of jobs.
- 26 April – Dr Tijion Esho, a cosmetic doctor who is noted for appearances on television, is struck off for giving free Botox treatment to a patient in return for sex at his clinic.
- 28 April – Police investigating the identity of a torso discovered at a nature reserve in Greater Manchester find other body parts.
- 29 April – At the Old Bailey, Lee Byer, 46, admits stabbing Thomas O'Halloran, in Greenford, west London, in August 2022. He pleads guilty to manslaughter on grounds of diminished responsibility.
- 30 April –
  - A man attacks people with a sword after crashing a van into a house in Hainault, London, killing one boy and injuring four others, including two police officers.
  - Proposed changes to the NHS Constitution for England include a rule that transgender women will not be accommodated on single-sex female wards.
  - Two people are charged in connection with the felling of the Sycamore Gap tree.

=== May ===
- 1 May –
  - The 14-year-old boy who died as a result of the previous day's sword attack in Hainault is named as Daniel Anjorin. A man is charged with his murder. The next day he is remanded in custody and charged with murder, as well as two counts of attempted murder.
  - Manchester's Co-op Live venue postpones its opening for a third time.
- 2 May –
  - South Yorkshire Police seize 22 illegal American XL bully dogs in a raid on a suspected breeding farm in Sheffield.
- Local elections take place for seats in 107 councils, 11 directly elected mayors, the London Assembly, and 33 police and crime commissioners (plus 4 in Wales).
- 3 May –
  - With 90% of council election results announced in the 2024 United Kingdom local elections, the Conservatives lose over 400 council seats, while Labour regains control of Hartlepool, Redditch and Thurrock Councils. Labour win Rushmoor for the first time ever.
  - Ben Houchen wins the Tees Valley mayoral election, retaining the seat for the Conservatives, while Labour win mayoral elections in the East Midlands, North East and York and North Yorkshire.
  - Chris Webb wins the 2024 Blackpool South by-election, with a 26% swing to Labour.
  - 2024 Peterborough City Council election: At 18, Daisy Creedon-Blakemore becomes the UK's youngest councillor after winning a seat for Labour in Peterborough City Council's Fletton and Woodston ward.
  - Shane Cunningham, Cartel Bushnell and Leo Knight are named and convicted by a judge at Bristol Crown Court over the killing of Mikey Roynon at a house party in Bath, Somerset, in June 2023.
  - A 15-year-old boy is convicted of the November 2023 murder of Alfie Lewis, who was stabbed outside a school in Leeds.
- 4 May
  - 2024 London mayoral election: Labour's Sadiq Khan secures a third term as Mayor of London with 44% of the vote, beating the Conservative Susan Hall on 33%.
  - 2024 West Midlands mayoral election: Labour's Richard Parker narrowly defeats the Conservative incumbent Andy Street to become Mayor of the West Midlands.
  - 2024 Greater Manchester mayoral election: Labour's Andy Burnham secures a third term as Mayor of Greater Manchester with almost two thirds of the votes cast.
- 5 May – Around 300 people gather at the car park of Hainault tube station to attend a vigil in memory of Daniel Anjorin.
- 6 May –
  - NHS England announces a roll-out of laser interstitial thermal therapy next month to help reduce seizures for patients with epilepsy that cannot be controlled by standard anti-seizure drugs.-->
- 7 May –
  - The Green Party's Siân Berry, who was re-elected in the 2024 London Assembly election, is criticised for resigning three days later to hand her seat to Zoë Garbett, who lost in the same election with 5.8% of the vote. Berry steps down from the post in order to run as Green candidate in Brighton Pavilion, where current MP Caroline Lucas is standing down at the next election.
  - British woman Holly LeGresley pleads guilty to her role in an online global monkey torturing network at a hearing held at Worcester Magistrates' Court, and will be sentenced in June.
- 8 May –
  - A hearing begins at the Court of Appeal into whether the sentence of Valdo Calocane was unduly lenient and should be increased.
  - The Court of Appeal overturns the manslaughter conviction of Auriol Grey, who was sentenced to three years in prison in 2023 over an incident in 2020 when she waved and shouted at cyclist Celia Ward, causing her to fall into the road in the path of a vehicle.
  - Former cricketer Monty Panesar withdraws his candidacy for the Workers Party of Britain to stand for election in Ealing Southall in the next UK general election, saying he needs more time to "mature and find my political feet".
- 9 May –
  - At the Old Bailey, Marius Gustavson, a self-styled "eunuch-maker" who mutilated customers who had paid for extreme body modification and streamed the process online, is sentenced to life imprisonment with a minimum term of 22 years.
  - A 22-year-old man is arrested following the fatal stabbing of a woman in her 60s at a bus stop in Edgware, north west London. The victim is subsequently identified as Anita Mukhey, a medical secretary with the NHS.
- 10 May – A man is stabbed and a responding police officer shot in the leg with a crossbow during an incident in High Wycombe. A suspect is shot by police and is described as having received life-changing injuries.
- 11 May –
  - A 22-year-old man is remanded in custody by Willesden magistrates charged with the murder of a 66-year-old woman at a bus stop in Edgware two days earlier.
  - Two men are arrested on suspicion of murder following a house fire in which two women died and four people were taken to hospital in Wolverhampton.
- 14 May –
  - The Court of Appeal rules that the sentence handed to Valdo Calocane was not unduly lenient, and he will remain in a secure hospital.
  - Three men appear in court charged with a plot to launch a gun attack against the Jewish community in northwest England.
  - Manchester's Co-op Live venue finally opens after being beset by problems that delayed its launch.
- 16 May –
  - A five-year-old boy dies after falling from the 15th floor of a tower block in Plaistow, East London.
  - New draft education guidelines drawn up by the government recommend schools in England should not teach children about gender identity.
- 18 May – Chelsea defeat Manchester United 6–0 to win the 2023–24 Women's Super League, giving the team their fifth WSL win and Emma Hayes' final win as Chelsea manager.
- 19 May –
  - Manchester City defeat West Ham 3–1 to win the 2023–24 Premier League, and secure their fourth successive Premier League title.
  - Police confirm that a 14-year-old boy, subsequently named as David Radut, has died and a 13-year-old boy is in hospital after they both got into difficulty in the River Tyne near Ovingham Bridge, Northumberland, the previous day.
- 20 May –
  - The Metropolitan Police confirm that a woman in her 50s has died following an attack by two XL Bully dogs at her home in east London.
  - Nursery worker Kate Roughley is found guilty of the manslaughter of nine-month-old Genevieve Meeham, whom she strapped face down to a beanbag and left for 90 minutes at a nursery in Stockport, Greater Manchester, in 2022.
- 22 May –
  - Police confirm that a second teenage boy, named as Aras Rudzianskas, has died after getting into trouble in the River Tyne a few days earlier.
  - North Yorkshire Police confirm one person has died following a mudslide at the edge of the North York Moors National Park.
  - Kate Roughley is sentenced to 14 years imprisonment for the manslaughter of Genevieve Meehan.
- Prime Minister Rishi Sunak asks the King to dissolve Parliament, setting a general election date of 4 July. Parliament is duly dissolved on 30 May.
- 23 May –
  - Sixteen people are arrested after a group calling itself Oxford Action for Palestine stages a sit-in at a University of Oxford building.
  - Mohamed Nur is sentenced to life imprisonment with a minimum of 32 years for a series of random machete attacks in south London that culminated in the murder of Johanita Kossiwa Dogbey in May 2023.
- 24 May –
  - Christina Robinson is sentenced to life imprisonment with a minimum of 25 years for the murder of her three-year-old son Dwelaniyah, whom she had caned and scalded before his death.
  - Police launch a murder investigation after the fatal stabbing of a woman, subsequently named as 34-year-old Amie Gray, on a beach in Bournemouth. A second woman who was stabbed is being treated in hospital.
- 25 May – South Yorkshire Police arrest 25 people following a street brawl in Sheffield.
- 28 May – Greater Manchester Police confirm that Labour deputy leader Angela Rayner will not face an investigation over her living arrangements before her time as an MP.
- 29 May –
  - The British Medical Association announces that junior doctors in England will stage a five-day strike from 27 June, ahead of the general election.
  - Four people, including a nine-year-old girl, are taken to hospital following a shooting near a restaurant on Kingsland High Street, Dalston in the London Borough of Hackney; the girl's condition is later described as critical.
- 31 May – A 20-year-old man is charged with the murder of Amie Gray.

=== June ===
- 1 June – A 20-year-old man is remanded in custody by Poole Magistrates charged with the murder of Amie Gray and the attempted murder of another woman on a beach in Bournemouth.
- 2 June – The first British Rail Class 805 units enter service with Avanti West Coast, travelling between London, the West Midlands and Liverpool.
- 4 June –
  - The East London Family Court discloses that DNA tests have indicated that Elsa, a newborn baby found in Newham earlier in the year, has two siblings, a boy and a girl, abandoned in similar circumstances by the same parents in 2017 and 2019 respectively.
  - Two people are arrested after a milkshake is thrown at Reform UK leader Nigel Farage as he launches his campaign in Clacton. The following day, a 25-year-old woman is charged with assault in connection with the incident.
  - Following his trial and conviction at Bradford Crown court, Rashane Doughas, 19, is sentenced to life imprisonment with a minimum of 28 years for the murder of two men outside a Halifax nightclub in October 2023.
- 5 June –
  - Following their trial and conviction at Sheffield Crown Court, Zoe Rider and Nicola Lethbridge are sentenced to life imprisonment with minimum terms of 26 years for the murder of vulnerable neighbour Stephen Koszyczarski in August 2023.
- 7 June – At Preston Crown Court, childminder Karen Foster pleads guilty to the manslaughter of nine-month old Harlow Collinge, whom she shook while he was in her care in May 2022, and who later died as a result of being shaken.
- 8 June –
  - Four people are taken to hospital after a funfair ride malfunctions at a country show in Lambeth.
  - Around 20,000 motorcyclists celebrate "Dave Day" by riding from London to Barrow-in-Furness in memory of "Hairy Biker" Dave Myers, a celebrity chef who died in February.
  - A parish council in Woodborough, Nottinghamshire, votes to trap and kill moles making molehills on a local field because it believes them to be a danger to the public.
- 10 June –
  - Two 12-year-old boys are found guilty of the November 2023 murder of Shawn Seesahai, who was stabbed through the heart with a machete in a Wolverhampton park.
  - New legislation comes into force requiring all cats in England over the age of 20 weeks to be microchipped, with owners facing a £500 fine if they do not comply with the new rules.
- 11 June – Five teenagers between the ages of 16 and 18, including two twins aged 16, are sent to prison for the September 2023 murder of Junior Osborne in Leicester.
- 13 June –
  - Guy Mukendi is sentenced to four years in prison for rape by "stealthing", in which he secretly removed a condom during sex with a woman without her consent.
  - Non-League football team Thornaby F.C. announces it is restoring its women's teams after announcing a few days earlier they would be discontinued, and following a backlash from prominent figures including England player Beth Mead.
- 14 June –
  - Following a trial at Winchester Crown Court, teenager Mason Reynolds, who holds neo-Nazi views, is sentenced to eight years in prison, with a further five on extended licence, after being convicted of a plot to blow up a synagogue in Hove.
  - A 12-year-old boy, subsequently named by police as Keaton Slater, is killed in a suspected hit-and-run incident in Coventry.
- 16 June –
  - Surrey Police says it has removed the driver of a police vehicle that hit an escaped cow on a suburban street from frontline duties and launched an internal investigation after footage of the incident appeared on social media two days earlier.
  - Three people are arrested, two of them on suspicion of manslaughter, following the death of a 16-year-old boy who was hit by a falling tree in Nottinghamshire the previous day.
  - A planned screening of The Last Screenwriter, a film written entirely by artificial intelligence, is axed by London's Prince Charles Cinema amid concerns from its customers about "the use of AI in place of a writer".
- 17 June – Following a trial at the Old Bailey, Elijah Gokool-Mely is convicted of the June 2023 murder of 17-year-old Victor Lee, who was stabbed three times and thrown into the Grand Union Canal.
- 18 June – Speciality and associate specialist (SAS) doctors in England vote to accept a pay offer from the government, ending their pay dispute.
- 19 June –
  - The jury at the trial of Constance Marten and Mark Gordon for crimes related to the death of their baby is discharged after being unable to reach a verdict.
  - Following his trial and conviction at Brighton Crown Court, Yura Varybrus, aged 17, is sentenced to life imprisonment with a minimum of 16 years for the murder of 17-year-old Charlie Cosser, who was stabbed three times at a party in Wareham in July 2023. Reporting restrictions on naming Varybrus, who is under the age of majority, are lifted.
  - Police in Coventry confirm that a seven-month old girl, who is subsequently named as Elle Doherty, died after being bitten on the head by the family dog on 16 June; the dog, which was not classed as a dangerous breed, was taken away and destroyed.
  - Just Stop Oil protestors cover part of Stonehenge in orange powder paint.
- 20 June – The Metropolitan Police refers itself to the Independent Office for Police Conduct following a complaint about its contact with a man charged with the murder of Amie Gray in Bournemouth.
- 21 June – Nick Adderley is dismissed as Chief Constable of Northamptonshire Police after a gross misconduct hearing which heard evidence that he exaggerated his naval rank, length of service and achievements.
- 24 June – With one match left to play in the group stage, England are guaranteed a place in the knockout stage of UEFA Euro 2024 after Spain win their Group B match against Albania.
- 26 June – The Crown Prosecution Service announces that a woman who killed two girls when her car ploughed into a school in Wimbledon after she experienced an epileptic seizure at the wheel will not face prosecution over the incident.
- 27 June –
  - Junior doctors in England begin a five-day strike, their eleventh since their pay dispute began.
  - A man is arrested after a Conservative campaigner delivering leaflets in Ford, Shropshire, is assaulted and left with two black eyes and a broken nose.
- 28 June –
  - A number of flights are disrupted after Gatwick Airport is forced to close its runway because of a broken down plane.
  - Six England fans are issued with football banning orders following trouble in Gelsenkirchen during the build-up to the England v Serbia game on 16 June.
  - A woman is injured during an attack by an American XL Bully in Eccles, Greater Manchester.
- 29 June –
  - Cleveland Police confirm that one man has died and seven people are in hospital after taking the insomnia drug zopiclone which may be contaminated.
  - A third arrest is made over the Just Stop Oil paint attack on Stonehenge.
  - One person is killed and five others injured following a crash between a car and a double decker bus in York.
- 30 June – The Metropolitan Police confirms that a woman has been charged in connection with a social media post that allegedly shows an inmate having sex with a member of prison staff in a cell at Wandsworth Prison.

=== July ===
- 1 July – UEFA launches an investigation into England's Jude Bellingham after he made a crotch-grabbing gesture towards the Slovakia bench after scoring a goal during the previous day's England v Slovakia game.
- 3 July –
  - The Charity Commission disqualifies Captain Tom Moore's daughter, Hannah Ingram-Moore, and her husband, Colin, from being charity trustees following an investigation into concerns about the management of the Captain Tom Foundation and its independence form the fundraiser's family.
  - Following a trial at the Old Bailey, Aminan Rahman is convicted of the murder of his wife, whom he killed in April 2023 after discovering her online affair, then placing her body in a suitcase and dumping it in a river.
  - Romanian national Marius Draghici, who was convicted over the deaths of 39 Vietnamese people in a lorry trailer, is to be deported from the UK.
  - Police in Armenia detain US citizen Aimee Betro, wanted for an attempted hit on a businessman in Birmingham in 2019.
- 4 July – Following conviction at Manchester Crown Court in May this year, former schoolteacher Rebecca Joynes, who had sexual relations with two schoolboys and became pregnant by one, is sentenced to six and a half years in prison.
- Polling takes place for the 2024 United Kingdom general election. In the following days, Keir Starmer is appointed prime minister as his Labour Party wins the election with a 174-seat majority.
- 6 July – Euro 2024: After finishing 1–1 at the end of extra time, England beat Switzerland 5–3 on penalties, taking them through to the semi-finals.
- 9 July – New Health Secretary Wes Streeting begins talks with junior doctors in England aimed at ending their pay dispute.
- 10 July –
  - The UK Health Security Agency confirms the deaths of two children who attended a primary school in Liverpool, but says the deaths are unlikely to be connected to an outbreak of giardia at the school.
  - Euro 2024: England win 2–1 against the Netherlands, with Ollie Watkins scoring a 90th minute winning goal, taking them through to the final against Spain.
- 11 July –
  - The UK Health Security Agency warns that nine babies in England have died as a result of whooping cough since November 2023 and that the number of cases is on the rise.
  - Two men are killed in a crash between two lorries and a car on the M62 motorway. Police subsequently confirm the men as two Ryanair pilots who were on their way to work at Liverpool Airport.
- 14 July – Euro 2024: England are beaten 2–1 against Spain in the final of the tournament.
- 16 July –
  - Gareth Southgate resigns as England manager following the team's defeat in the Euro 2024 final.
  - The England women's football team secure qualification to Euro 2025 after drawing 0–0 with Sweden in their final qualifier match.
  - Three people, two men and a woman, are found dead in South Shields from a suspected batch of dangerous drugs. Two people linked to the drug deaths are later arrested by Northumbria Police.
- 19 July – At the Old Bailey, teenager Elijah Gokool-Mely is sentenced to life imprisonment with a minimum of 20 years for the robbery and murder of Victor Lee, who was stabbed three times and pushed into a canal.
- 20 July –
  - Graham Gomm, a prisoner from HMP Wormwood Scrubs who escaped during a hospital visit on 18 July, is recaptured by police.
  - 2024 Harehills riot: A man is charged with arson and violent disorder, and remanded in custody, after a bus was set on fire during the disorder.
- 21 July –
  - Four people are killed after their car crashes into a tree on the A436 near Cheltenham.
  - Six people are killed in a crash between a car and motorbike on the A61 Wakefield Road between Wakefield and Barnsley.
  - A 15-year-old boy, subsequently named as Rene Graham, is shot dead in a park at Ladbroke Grove in London.
  - An eight-year-old boy, subsequently named as Joshua Hillstead, drowns in the River Arrow in Worcestershire.
- 22 July – A woman in her 30s, subsequently named as Kelly Reilly, is killed in an attack by her pet American bulldog in Coventry.
- 23 July –
  - A British soldier is stabbed in an attack in Gillingham, Kent, and taken to hospital. A 24-year-old man is subsequently arrested in connection with the incident.
  - A teenage boy drowns in Lodge Farm Reservoir in Dudley.
- 24 July –
  - Ten Just Stop Oil protestors are arrested after attempting to disrupt activity at Heathrow Airport.
  - A 57-year-old woman is murdered while walking her dog in Brantham in Suffolk.
- 25 July –
  - A man is remanded in custody charged with the attempted murder of a soldier in Gillingham following an incident on 23 July.
  - The National Blood Service appeals for donations of type O blood due to supplies in England dropping to "unprecedently low" levels.
- 28 July – Two men are killed when a light aircraft crashes near Selby, North Yorkshire.
- 29 July –
  - The UK government and the British Medical Association (BMA) reach agreement on an improved pay deal for junior doctors in England worth 22% on average over two years, which the BMA will put to its members.
  - Appearing at Isleworth Crown Court, Linda De Sousa Abreu, a prison officer at Wandsworth Prison, pleads guilty to misconduct in public office after a video of her having sex with an inmate was posted online.
- 30 July – One person is stabbed and eight arrested following a disturbance on the seafront at Southend-on-Sea.
- 31 July – Brwa Shorsh, who pushed a postman in front of an oncoming train at Oxford Circus tube station on 3 February, is found guilty of attempted murder following a trial at Inner London Crown Court.

=== August ===
- 1–11 August – The artist Banksy creates a series of animal-themed works in various locations in London.
- 1 August –
  - GPs in England vote to take industrial action by working-to-rule over a lack of funding and a decline in care, which could see GP appointments capped at 25 per day.
  - Five Just Stop Oil protestors who blocked the M25 motorway in November 2022 are sentenced to prison terms of between twenty months and two years at a hearing at Basildon Crown Court.
- 2 August – Chester Zoo announces the birth of a Persian onager, believed to be one of the rarest animals on earth.
- 3 August – Five people are rescued after a bus plunges off a bridge into a river near Whitby, North Yorkshire.
- 7 August –
  - NHS England announces the establishment of six new regional centres for under 18s struggling with their gender identity.
  - Police launch an investigation after three teenagers are treated in hospital following a shooting incident in Orpington, southeast London.
- 9 August –
  - Lee Carsley is appointed as interim England manager following the departure of Gareth Southgate.
  - A small number of people are injured following a crowd surge at the Boardmasters Festival in Newquay.
- 12 August –
  - A 32-year-old man is detained by police after a 34-year-old woman and 11-year-old girl are stabbed in London's Leicester Square. The victims are treated in hospital. The man is subsequently remanded in custody charged with attempted murder.
  - 2023 Nottingham attacks: The BBC's Panorama obtains information suggesting that a psychiatrist who treated Valdo Calocane warned authorities he was a potential danger three years before the he killed three people in the Nottingham attacks.
  - Graphic design student Hugh Nelson pleads guilty to creating indecent images of children after admitting using artificial intelligence to make "bespoke" graphic child abuse images which he then sold to other paedophiles.
- 13 August –
  - 2023 Nottingham attacks: A review published by the Care Quality Commission finds "a series of errors, omissions and misjudgements" by mental health services in the lead up to the attacks.
  - A major incident is declared following a chemical spillage of sodium cyanide into a canal in Walsall, West Midlands. A 12-mile stretch of the canal is closed while emergency services deal with the spillage.
- 14 August –
  - Analysis of the Altar Stone at Stonehenge indicates it came from northern Scotland rather than south west Wales, as had previously been thought.
  - The source of a sodium cyanide spillage is identified as Anochrome Ltd, a company dealing in surface coatings and sealing.
- 15 August – David Saynor, who used his Rotherham-based limousine business to groom and sexually abuse young girls, is sentenced to 24 years in prison.
- 16 August – Train drivers' union ASLEF announces that its members at LNER will stage strikes every weekend through to September and October, as well as two in November, following what it describes as a breakdown in industrial relations and agreements.
- 17 August – Around 100 firefighters from the London Fire Brigade are sent to tackle a fire at Somerset House in central London. The building, used as an arts venue, was scheduled to host a breakdancing competition.
- 18 August –
  - The Courtauld Gallery at Somerset House reopens to the public following the previous day's fire, but the rest of the building remains closed.
  - A 43-year-old woman, subsequently named as Alberta Obinim, is killed, and two other people injured following a stabbing incident in Gorton, Greater Manchester.
- 20 August – A man, subsequently named as David Daintree, is killed in an attack by his American XL Bully dog at his home in Accrington, Lancashire.
- 22 August –
  - The National Institute for Health and Care Excellence (NICE) confirms that Lecanemab, the first drug developed that slows the early stages of Alzheimer's disease, will not be made available on the NHS in England because its benefits "are too small to justify the costs".
  - Police issue an urgent appeal for the whereabouts of two bulldogs that are believed to have killed a 33-year-old man at a property in Rubery, Birmingham, the previous day.
  - A suspect in the stabbing of Alberta Obinim, is detained under the Mental Health Act.
  - Three men are charged with murder following the death of a prisoner at HM Prison Fosse Way on 20 August.
- 23 August – Police confirm two dogs believed to be responsible for the death of a 33-year-old man at a property in Birmingham have been found on nearby grassland.
- 25 August – The Metropolitan Police confirm that three people, including a 32-year-old woman, have been stabbed during incidents at the Notting Hill Carnival.
- 28 August – A man who threw objects at Nigel Farage during an election campaign in Barnsley on 11 June is given a suspended prison sentence.
- 29 August –
  - A 17-year-old boy is convicted of the January 2023 murder of Holly Newton, aged 15, in Hexham, Northumberland after stalking her.
  - The Office for National Statistics releases figures showing that local authorities in England spent £1bn on temporary housing for homeless families in 2023, a 50% increase on the previous year.
  - Michael Donaldson, who threatened to stab Ed Miliband during a constituency visit in March, is sentenced to three years in prison following a trial at Sheffield Crown Court.
  - Police launch a murder investigation after a 13-year-old boy is stabbed to death at his home in Oldbury, West Midlands.
- 30 August –
  - The UK government announces that badger culling in England as a means to fight the spread of bovine tuberculosis will end in the next five years, with separate vaccines for badgers and cattle being developed instead.
  - Luton Borough Council asks Bedfordshire Police to stop working with the television programme 24 Hours in Police Custody because it argues the show is damaging the town's reputation.
- 31 August –
  - The Metropolitan Police confirm that two people who were attacked in separate incidents at the Notting Hill Carnival have died. Cher Maximen, a 32-year-old mother of two, was stabbed at the Carnival on 25 August, while Swedish chef Mussie Imnetu was found unconscious near the event on the evening of 26 August.
  - The bodies of a man and three children are found at a property in Staines-upon-Thames, Surrey.
  - Around 650 UK Border Force staff at Heathrow Airport begin a four-day strike over a long-running pay dispute.

=== September ===
- 1 September –
  - Two teenage boys are arrested on suspicion of the murder of a 13-year-old boy who was stabbed at his home in Oldbury, West Midlands, on 29 August.
  - Police criticise motorists for allowing their children to "run freely on the carriageway", and play football and frisbee, after a stretch of the M6 motorway was temporarily closed following an accident in Lancashire the previous day.
- 2 September – British endurance swimmer Sam Farrow of Wigan, Greater Manchester, is believed to have set a new world record after swimming the length of Lake Geneva in 22 hours and 48 minutes.
- 3 September – Leicestershire Police say that five children are in custody on suspicion of the murder of an 80-year-old man who was killed while walking his dog in a Leicester park on 1 September.
- 4 September –
  - Around 70 firefighters from the London Fire Brigade tackle a fire at a block of high rise flats in Catford. No injuries are reported and an investigation is begun to determine the cause of the fire.
  - The Met Office issues a yellow weather warning for heavy rain, with a month's worth of rain expected to fall over two days in some areas of England.
  - A 14-year-old boy is charged with the murder of 80-year-old Bhim Kohli in a park in Leicester on 1 September.
- 5 September – A man is charged with the murder of Swedish chef Mussie Imnetu, who was attacked near the Notting Hill Carnival.
- 8 September – Keepers at Birdland Park and Gardens in Gloucestershire successfully hatch a southern cassowary chick, described as one of the world's largest and deadliest birds.
- 9 September – Steven Ling, a farm worker who was sentenced to life imprisonment in 1998 for murdering Joanne Tulip on Christmas Day 1997 by stabbing her 60 times during sex, is cleared to be released on licence by the Parole Board.
- 10 September – Nurse Ruth Auta, whose ten-week-old son died after she left him at home alone for eight hours while she went to work in December 2022, is sentenced to three years in prison at Bolton Crown Court.
- 13 September – Former Metropolitan police officer PC Craig Carter is sentenced to 16 months in prison for stealing £115 from Italian filmmaker and actor Claudio Gaetani after he collapsed and died in the street in September 2022.
- 14 September –
  - An 18-year-old man is charged with three counts of murder following the discovery of the bodies of a woman and two teenage children at a flat in a tower block in Luton, Bedfordshire the previous day.
  - Ormiston Academies Trust, one of England's largest school academy trusts, announces plans to ban the use of mobile phones during the school day.
- 16 September – Junior doctors in England accept the government's offer of a 22% pay rise over two years, ending their long-running dispute.
- 17 September – A 26-year-old man is remanded in custody charged with the murders of Carol Hunt and her two daughters in Bushey, Hertfordshire.
- 19 September – The final edition of the London Evening Standard is published, before it switches to a weekly format titled The London Standard, published each Thursday from 26 September.
- 20 September – Building surveyor Roger Bryant and his sons James and Scott, who defrauded £1m out of the National Trust with the use of fake invoices, are sentenced after conviction at Bristol Crown Court. Roger Bryant receives six and a half years' imprisonment, and James Bryant four years, while Scott Bryant is given a two-year suspended sentence.
- 23 September – The Royal College of Nursing announces that nurses in England have rejected the offer of a 5.5% pay increase from the government.
- 25 September – Two people are arrested following the death the previous day of a woman at Gloucestershire Royal Hospital, who is believed to have undergone a non-surgical Brazilian butt lift.
- 26 September – The Metropolitan Police announce that seven officers, two of whom have resigned, are to face a gross misconduct hearing for accessing files relating to the murder of Sarah Everard without a proper policing purpose.
- 27 September – Just Stop Oil activists Phoebe Plummer and Anna Holland are sentenced to two years and 20 months in prison respectively for throwing soup over Vincent van Gogh's painting Sunflowers at the National Gallery in 2022. Within hours of the sentence, three members of the group throw soup on two of van Gogh's paintings, including Sunflowers, at the same venue. Three people are subsequently charged over the incident.
- 29 September –
  - A yellow weather warning for heavy rain is in place overnight into the following day for southeast England. A yellow warning is also in place for the south west, with high winds leading to disruption and train cancellations in Devon and Cornwall.
  - An eight-year-old boy, named subsequently as Jay Cartmell, dies after being shot in the face and head during an incident at a farm in Cumbria the previous day.
- 30 September –
  - The Parole Board is asked to reconsider its decision to release Steven Ling, sentenced to life imprisonment for the murder of Joanne Tulip.
  - A lorry crashes through the barrier and plunges 60 ft from the M6 motorway at the Thelwall Viaduct. The driver escapes with only minor injuries.

=== October ===
- 1 October –
  - Three men who set fire to a double decker bus during the Harehills riot in July 2024 are sentenced to terms in prison ranging from five years and four months to six years.
  - Old Marylebone Town Hall celebrates its 100th anniversary by hosting 100 weddings and civil partnerships for couples who have paid £100 each to take part.
- 3 October –
  - In a letter to the exam regulator Ofqual, Education Secretary Bridget Phillipson advises that GCSE students in England should continue to receive post-Covid help in the form of formula and equation sheets during exams. The arrangement was previously scheduled to end in 2024.
  - Researchers at Universal College London publish research estimating that the number of people in England who are vaping without having previously smoked has reached one million.
  - Deveca Rose is found guilty of the manslaughter of her four children, who died in a house fire while she was out shopping in November 2021.
  - Convicted child killer Dominic McKilligan, sentenced to life imprisonment for the 1998 abduction and murder of 11-year-old Wesley Neailey, has his application for parole rejected by the Parole Board, as well as losing an application to be transferred to an open prison.
- 4 October –
  - Two Metropolitan Police officers who were dismissed over a July 2020 stop and search involving athlete Bianca Williams and her partner are reinstated following an appeal.
  - A blue plaque is installed at a branch of Tesco in Walthamstow to mark the October 2022 purchase of the Liz Truss lettuce, which famously outlived her premiership.
  - A flight from Manchester Airport is delayed after a passenger "incorrectly" boarded the wrong plane.
- 5 October – NHS England announces that children with special educational needs in England are to be offered free eye, hearing and dental checks at their schools from 2025.
- 9 October –
  - The UK government expands the programme that allows parents in England who lost a baby during pregnancy to apply for a certificate recognising their loss. The certificate can now be applied for by anyone who lost a baby before 24 weeks, or before 28 weeks before 1 October 1992.
  - An investigation into a disgraced bone surgeon who worked at Great Ormond Street Hospital is expanded to cover 721 patients treated at a further five hospitals.
  - Reporting restrictions that prevented the killer of 15-year-old Holly Newton from being identified are lifted, and he is named as Logan MacPhail, her ex-boyfriend, who was 16 at the time of the kiling in January 2023.
- 10 October – At Inner London Crown Court, Brwa Shorsh is sentenced to life imprisonment with a minimum of eight years for the attempted murder of a man he pushed onto the track at Oxford Circus tube station in February. The victim narrowly escaped an oncoming train after being helped off the track by a fellow passenger.
- 11 October – Five people are rescued and one is missing after a boat capsizes on the River Thames at Walton-on-Thames.
- 14 October –
  - Detectives from Bedfordshire Police use the BBC's Crimewatch Live programme to appeal for information that may lead to the identity of a hitman who killed Carol Morgan on 13 August 1981 at the shop she ran with her husband, Allen Morgan, in Leighton Buzzard. Allen Morgan was convicted of hiring the hitman to kill his wife at Luton Crown Court in June 2024.
  - After being asked to review its fares policy by the Department for Transport, Northern Trains announces the withdrawal of all live prosecutions against passengers reported for using railcard discounts for on-peak services where the original fare was below £12.
- 15 October – The UK government announces a five-year trial of the weight loss drug Mounjaro in Greater Manchester as a means to treat unemployed people with obesity.
- 16 October – An inquest into the death of Debbie Leitch, a 24-year-old woman from Blackpool with Down's syndrome, who died in August 2019 after being starved and neglected by her mother, concludes that she was unlawfully killed.
- 17 October –
  - A pregnant woman and her unborn child are killed after the car they were travelling in collides with an unmarked police car in Eltham, southeast London.
  - 2024 United Kingdom riots: Former childminder Lucy Connolly, whose husband is a Conservative councillor on West Northamptonshire Council, is sentenced to 31 months in prison over an online post in which she called for hotels housing asylum seekers to be set on fire.
- 19 October – One person is killed and another seriously injured following an explosion at a house in Bedford.
- 20 October – Health Secretary Wes Streeting rejects suggestions that plans to give unemployed people with obesity injections of weight loss drugs are "dystopian".
- 21 October – Victoria Thomas Bowen pleads guilty to assault by beating over an incident in which she threw a McDonald's milkshake over Nigel Farage as he launched his general election campaign in Clacton-on-Sea on 4 June; she will be sentenced by Westminster Magistrates' Court in December.
- 22 October – Police searching for missing mother Victoria Taylor, who disappeared from her home in Malton, North Yorkshire on 30 September, recover a body from the River Derwent.
- 23 October – Birmingham Airport is evacuated because of a suspicious vehicle, leading to flight disruption.
- 25 October –
  - The Metropolitan Police confirms an inquiry into the theft of £300,000 worth of cheese from a London cheesemaker by fraudsters posing as genuine wholesalers.
  - Far-right activist Tommy Robinson is remanded in custody on a contempt of court charge after handing himself into a police station in Folkestone, Kent. On 28 October he is found in contempt and sentenced to 18 months in prison for repeating false allegations against a Syrian refugee, in breach of an injunction.

=== November ===
- 1 November –
  - Logan MacPhail is sentenced to life imprisonment with a minimum term of 17 years for the murder of 15-year-old Holly Newton in January 2023, whom he stalked for more than an hour before stabbing her multiple times in an alleyway.
  - Thomas Wei Huang, aged 17, is named as the boy who carried out a hammer attack at a Devon boarding school on two fellow students and a teacher after a judge lifts an order preventing him from being identified.
  - Police arrest six teenagers on suspicion of attempted murder following the stabbing of a 13-year-old girl, who was discovered beside the A61 dual carriageway near Hessle, East Riding of Yorkshire.
  - A planned strike by members of the RMT union working on the London Underground is called off at the last minute following discussions between union representatives and those from Transport for London.
- 2 November –
  - A 10-year-old girl is confirmed to have died after being bitten by a family dog in an incident in North Yorkshire the previous day.
  - Police confirm that a teenage boy has been charged with the attempted murder of a 13-year-old girl who was found stabbed by a roadside in East Yorkshire.
  - Portsmouth City Council becomes the latest UK local authority to be hit by a suspected Russian cyberattack.
- 5 November –
  - Planned strikes by London Underground staff belonging to ASLEF are suspended following talks between union officials and Transport for London.
  - The UK government announces that the Tobacco and Vapes Bill will include plans to ban smoking outside schools and hospitals in England, but will not extend the ban to beer gardens as had been proposed previously.
- 6 November -
  - Wharton Green resident Craig Dentith feels 'abandoned' by developers

https://www.northwichguardian.co.uk/news/24700999.wharton-green-resident-feels-abandoned-developers/

- 9 November –
  - Police launch an inquiry into the death of nine-year-old Bradley Nelson, who was left blind and brain damaged after being shaken as a baby, following his death at Scarborough General Hospital in October.
  - Four people are charged with the murder of Matthew Adams, who died after being assaulted at a pub in West Bromwich in March 2023. A fifth is charged with violent disorder for the same incident.
- 8 November – Two people are killed in a house fire in Coventry. An investigation by West Midlands Fire Service subsequently pinpoints the source of the fire as a pedal bike that had been converted into an electric bike and stored in the property's hallway.
- 10 November –
  - One man is killed and two other people receive gunshot injuries in an incident in Sydenham, south east London.
  - A Northamptonshire nurse is struck off after drinking alcohol while at work and offering alcohol to her colleagues.
- 11 November – It is announced that the University of Salford's Centenary Building, which won the 1996 Stirling Prize and had been empty since 2016, is to be demolished because of its ageing infrastructure.
- 12 November – The Independent Office for Police Conduct confirms that a 17-year-old girl was killed when she was struck by a vehicle on the M5 motorway the previous evening shortly after exiting a police vehicle.
- 14 November –
  - Six children are rescued by firefighters following a bus crash in Cambridgeshire.
  - The UK government confirms it will stick with the current cap on Council Tax rises, meaning local authorities may increase rates in England by up to 5% in April 2025.
- 15 November – Four teenagers and a man are convicted of the January 2024 murders of friends Mason Rist and Max Dixon in Bristol following a case of mistaken identity.
- 16 November –
  - A woman whose body was found in the boot of a car in Ilford, Essex, two days earlier is named by police as Harshita Brella from Corby, Northamptonshire.
  - A crash on the M62 motorway in West Yorkshire following a high speed police chase results in four arrests and one person in hospital.
- 17 November –
  - Greater Manchester Police begin a double murder investigation after two men die from stab wounds in the city's Moss Side district in the early hours.
  - In an article for The Sun on Sunday, former Transport Secretary David Blunkett, who is blind, calls for Transport for London to hold an urgent review of what he describes as "death trap" platforms on the London Underground after falling into the gap between the platform and a train at Westminster tube station.
- 18 November – Two Metropolitan Police officers are charged with four counts of sexual assault on a woman in London.
- 19 November – Antony Snook, who drove four teenagers to the location where friends Mason Rist and Max Dixon were stabbed to death, is sentenced to life imprisonment with a minimum term of 38 years; the four teenagers will be sentenced in December.
- 20 November –
  - A 92-year-old man appears in court charged with the 1967 murder of Louisa Dunne in Bristol.
  - The funeral of Liam Payne, the singer and member of One Direction, is held in Amersham, Buckinghamshire.
- 22 November –
  - A large section of Gatwick Airport's South Terminal is evacuated following the discovery of a prohibited item in a piece of luggage.
  - A blue plaque is unveiled at the childhood home of Hollywood actor Cary Grant in Bishopston, Bristol.
  - Following a trial at Ipswich Crown Court, Scott Jeff is found guilty of the June 2023 murder of Isabella Jonas-Wheildon; Isabella's mother, Chelsea Gleason-Mitchell, who met Jeff 36 days before the toddler's death, is cleared of murder but admits causing or allowing the death of a child.
  - A murder investigation begins after a man is found shot dead in a car in the Edgbaston area of Birmingham; a second man is found seriously injured close by. Police subsequently make an arrest in connection with the incident.
- 23 November –
  - Storm Bert:
    - A 34-year-old man is killed when his car goes off the road and hits a brick wall in West Yorkshire.
    - Hampshire Police report that a man in his 60s was killed when a tree fell on his car on the A34 near Winchester.
- 26 November – A woman who kept her baby daughter in a drawer for the first three years of her life is sentenced to seven years in prison following a trial at Chester Crown Court.
- 27 November – A man is arrested after women were secretly filmed on nights out in north west England and the footage posted on social media.
- 28 November –
  - Greater Manchester Police announce that the remains of a baby found in a field by a dog walker on 20 November are those of a newborn girl, whom they have named Ava.
  - London Northwestern resume train services at Northampton railway station after the station was closed due to flooding from Storm Bert.
- 29 November –
  - Saplings from the Sycamore Gap tree are to be given to charities and organisations throughout the UK as "trees of hope".
  - Directors of the JG Windows music store in Newcastle's Central Arcade, described as the "cornerstone" of North East England's musical heritage for more than 100 years, announce that it has "closed permanently".
- 30 November – Dr Sharon George, a chemist and former senior lecturer in environmental sustainability, suggests that powerful odours from the Walleys Quarry landfill site in Silverdale, Staffordshire, may be linked to people doing more DIY during the COVID-19 pandemic.

=== December ===
- 1 December – Two young children, including a baby, are taken to hospital after a car crashes into a group of pedestrians at a Christmas market in Chipping Sodbury near Bristol.
- 3 December – Tim Thornton, Professor of History at the University of Huddersfield, uncovers fresh evidence pointing to Richard III's guilt in the murders of his nephews, Edward V and Richard, Duke of York. The evidence concerns a chain belonging to Edward that was mentioned in the will of the sister-in-law of one of Richard III's trusted servants.
- 4 December – West Northamptonshire Council announces £3m in loans for Grosvenor Shopping Centre.
- 5 December – Martyn Oliver, the Chief Inspector of Ofsted, says there is an "alarming" level of children missing school which has become a "stubborn and damaging issue".
- 6 December – Alternative healer Hongchi Xiao is sentenced to ten years in prison for the manslaughter of Danielle Carr-Gomm, a 71-year-old woman with type 1 diabetes, who died after she stopped taking her insulin medication at one of his slap therapy workshops in 2016.
- 7 December –
  - Storm Darragh:
    - A man is killed after a tree fell onto his van on the A59 in Longton, Lancashire.
    - A man is killed in the Erdington area of Birmingham after a tree falls on his car during high winds.
  - West Ham United announces its striker Michail Antonio has been involved in a road traffic accident.
  - The BBC reports that a headstone at St Chad's Church, Shrewsbury used as the grave of Ebenezer Scrooge in the 1984 film adaptation of Charles Dickens' A Christmas Carol, has been restored in time for Christmas after vandals smashed it in November. The prop was left behind at the church after work on the film finished and has become a tourist attraction.
- 8 December – West Ham striker Michail Antonio is described as "stable" in hospital following his involvement in a road traffic accident the previous day and subsequent surgery on a lower limb fracture.
- 9 December –
  - The Government of Keir Starmer abandons a £15m plan set out by the preceding Sunak ministry to convert HM Prison Northeye near Bexhill-on-Sea, East Sussex, into an asylum camp.
  - Premier League official David Coote is sacked by referees' body the PGMOL following a "thorough investigation" into his conduct after video of him making derogatory comments about Liverpool F.C. and their former manager, Jurgen Klopp, were circulated on social media.
- 10 December – Police express their concern for the safety of England rugby union international Tom Voyce after he went missing in Cumbria during flooding as a result of Storm Darragh.
- 12 December –
  - Two women are treated in hospital, and a further 11 people at the scene, following an incident involving a fairground ride in Birmingham's Centenary Square.
  - A Christmas party for staff at Liverpool F.C. held at the city's Anglican cathedral is shut down by police following the discovery of drugs paraphernalia.
- 13 December –
  - An inquest into the death of former British Army soldier Daniel Burke, who died in August 2023 while fighting in Ukraine against Russia, finds that he was killed unlawfully by a "comrade".
  - A body found during the search for Tom Voyce is confirmed as being that of the missing rugby player.
  - Scott Jeff is sentenced to life imprisonment with a minimum term of 26 years for the murder of Isabella Jonas-Wheildon, his partner's two-year-old daughter.
- 14 December – Police begin a murder investigation after a woman, subsequently named as 46-year-old Michelle Sadio, is killed in a triple shooting outside a church in Harlesden, north west London; two men who also received gunshot wounds are treated in hospital.
- 16 December –
  - Data published by NHS England indicates that one in four babies in England are now born by Caesarean section.
  - South Lakes Safari Zoo near Dalton, Cumbria, announces that will close later in December after a BBC investigation raised concerns about animal welfare.
  - Victoria Thomas Bowen, who threw a milkshake over Reform UK leader Nigel Farage in Clacton-on-Sea during the general election campaign, is given a 13-week prison sentence suspended for 12 months.
- 18 December –
  - Nasen Saadi is found guilty of the murder of Amie Gray and the attempted murder of another woman who were stabbed on a beach in Bournemouth on 24 May.
  - Thomas Johnson, 19, who was filmed inhaling laughing gas as he drove his car, then killed three passengers following a high speed chase in Oxfordshire, is sentenced to nine years and four months in prison.
  - The UK government publishes plans to give armed forces veterans and their families priority access to social housing.
  - The UK government announces an extra £700m for councils in England during 2025 to help rebuild their finances.
  - Police are called to what is described as a heated meeting of Oldham Council.
- 19 December –
  - Two 13-year-old boys, who are the UK's youngest convicted knife killers, have their sentences for the November 2023 murder of 19-year-old Shawn Seesahai increased from eight and a half to ten years by the Court of Appeal.
  - Office for National Statistics data indicate "a catastrophic rise" in alcohol-related deaths in England since 2019, with more than 8,200 in 2023, a 42% increase on 2019; the North East is shown as having the highest rates.
  - Health Secretary Wes Streeting announces £100m of government spending over two years for hospices in England to help improve end-of-life care.
  - Four teenagers are sentenced to life imprisonment for the murders of friends Max Dixon and Mason Rist in Bristol in January 2024.
- 24 December –
  - A man armed with a knife is shot dead by police during an incident at an address in Redditch, Worcestershire.
  - The singer Ariana Grande donates Christmas presents to children in hospital across Manchester.
- 25 December – Two women are stabbed to death and a teenage boy and a man injured during an incident at a block of flats in Bletchley, Milton Keynes.
- 26 December –
  - The UK government announces that it has committed to lifting the deadline to map and record public rights of way in England.
  - Greater Manchester Police confirm that a man has been charged with the murder of Marianne Borocz, who disappeared on 14 December, and whose body was found eleven days later.
- 27 December – A man is charged with the murders of Joanne Pearson and Teohna Grant, who were stabbed at a block of flats in Milton Keynes on Christmas Day.
- 28 December –
  - A woman is remanded in custody charged with the murder of a man, named as Louis Price, at a property in Norton Canes, Staffordshire, on Christmas Day.
  - Network Rail warns of train disruptions between Chorley and Bolton, and services to and from Preston, after £100,000 worth of overhead cables was stolen from railway lines over the Christmas holidays.
  - A murder investigation begins following the stabbing of a man, later named as Recorda Davey-Ann Clarke, in Willesden, north west London. A man is subsequently charged with murder.
- 29 December – Four boys are arrested on suspicion of murder after an 18-year-old youth was stabbed to death in Ilkeston, Derbyshire the previous day.
- 30 December – £500,000 worth of distinctive gold jewellery is stolen in a burglary at a property in Bromley, east London.
- 31 December – Three people are taken to hospital following a suspected gas explosion at a house in Whitehaven, Cumbria.

=== Scheduled events ===
- 22–30 May – Pakistani cricket team in England in 2024
- 10–30 July – West Indian cricket team in England in 2024

== Holidays ==
- 1 January – New Year's Day
- 29 March – Good Friday
- 1 April – Easter Monday
- 6 May – Early May bank holiday
- 27 May – Spring May Bank Holiday
- 26 August – Summer Bank Holiday
- 25 December – Christmas Day
- 26 December – Boxing Day

== Deaths ==
=== January ===
- 1 January – Graham Tripp, 91, English cricketer (Somerset).
- 2 January – Matisyahu Salomon, 86, English-born American rabbi.
- 3 January – Bobby Hoy, 73, English footballer (Huddersfield Town, Halifax Town, Blackburn Rovers). (death announced on this date)
- 4 January –
  - Georgina Hale, 80, English actress (Mahler, The Devils, Castaway).
  - Keith Lamb, 77, English football executive, chief executive of Middlesbrough (1987–2011).
- 5 January – Del Palmer, 71, English singer-songwriter, bass guitarist, and sound engineer.
- 7 January – Tony Clarkin, 77, English guitarist and songwriter (Magnum).
- 10 January – Peter Johnson, 84, English food industry and football executive, chairman of Tranmere Rovers (1987–1998, 2000–2014) and Everton (1994–1999).
- 13 January – Mel Blyth, 79, English footballer (Crystal Palace, Southampton, Millwall). (death announced on this date)
- 14 January – Malcolm Alker, 45, English rugby league player (Salford Red Devils, national team). (death announced on this date)
- 16 January – Laurie Johnson, 96, English composer and bandleader.
- 18 January –
  - Ray Henderson, 86, English footballer (Hull City, Reading). (death announced on this date)
  - John Hurst, 76, English footballer (Everton, Oldham Athletic).
  - Mick Ives, 84, English racing cyclist.
  - Alan Mills, 88, English tennis player and official, referee for Wimbledon Championships (1983–2005).
- 20 January – Doug Padgett, 89, English cricketer (Yorkshire, national team).
- 22 January – Tommy Baldwin, 78, English footballer (Chelsea, Arsenal, Seattle Sounders).
- 23 January – Martin Middlebrook, 91, English military historian and writer. (death announced on this date)
- 26 January – Keith Booth, 81, English cricket writer. (death announced on this date)
- 27 January –
  - Peter Glynn, 71, English rugby league player (St. Helens, Salford, national team). (death announced on this date)
  - Malcolm Gregson, 80, English golfer. (death announced on this date)
- 28 January – Lenny Piper, 46, English footballer (Gillingham, St Albans City, Farnborough).
- 29 January – David Smith, 88, English Anglican clergyman, bishop of Bradford (1992–2002). (death announced on this date)
- 30 January – Abe Terry, 89, English rugby league player (St Helens).

=== February ===
- 1 February – Patrick Hanks, 83, English lexicographer and linguist.
- 2 February –
  - Jonnie Irwin, 50, English television presenter (A Place in the Sun, Escape to the Country, To Buy or Not to Buy). (death announced on this date)
  - Derrick McIntyre, 66, English bassist (Jamiroquai), worked with Emeli Sande, Will Young), and Beverley Knight.
- 4 February – Keagan Kirkby, 25, English jockey.
- 10 February – Ian Lawson, 84, English footballer (Leeds United, Burnley, Crystal Palace). (death announced on this date)
- 12 February – Steve Wright, 69, English disc jockey and radio personality (Steve Wright in the Afternoon).
- 15 February – Peter Armitage, 99, English medical statistician.
- 16 February – Bryan Thomas, 95, English architect. (death announced on this date)
- 17 February – Eddie Mitchell, 69, English football club owner (AFC Bournemouth).
- 21 February – Charlie Strutton, 34, English footballer (Chalfont St Peter, AFC Wimbledon, Slough Town).
- 22 February –
  - Paul Bradshaw, 67, English footballer (Blackburn Rovers, Wolverhampton Wanderers, Peterborough United). (death announced on this date)
  - John Lowe, 81, English pianist (The Quarrymen).
- 23 February – Chris Gauthier, 48, English-born Canadian actor (Once Upon a Time, Eureka, Freddy vs. Jason).
- 24 February –
  - Stan Bowles, 75, English footballer (Queens Park Rangers, Brentford, national team), complications from Alzheimer's disease.
  - Chris Nicholl, 77, English-born Northern Irish football player (Aston Villa, Southampton, Northern Ireland national team) and manager.
- 28 February – Dave Myers, 66, English television presenter (The Hairy Bikers' Cookbook).
- 29 February – John Etty, 97, English rugby league player (Batley Bulldogs, Oldham, Wakefield Trinity).

=== March ===
- 4 March – Maurice Bembridge, 79, English golfer. (death announced on this date)
- 8 March – Duncan Fearnley, 83, English cricketer (Worcestershire). (death announced on this date)
- 9 March – Jimmy Husband, 76, English footballer (Everton, Luton Town, Memphis Rogues).
- 13 March –
  - Steve Smith, 77, English football player (Huddersfield Town, Halifax Town) and manager.
  - Gerry Summers, 90, English football player (West Bromwich Albion, Sheffield United, Hull City), coach and manager.
- 15 March – Mike Chaney, 93, English editor, broadcasting executive and journalist.
- 17 March –
  - Steve Harley, 73, English musician (Steve Harley & Cockney Rebel), songwriter ("Make Me Smile (Come Up and See Me)", "Mr. Soft") and producer, cancer.
  - Robin Hobbs, 81, English cricketer (Essex, Glamorgan, national team).
- 18 March –
  - Ron Baynham, 94, English footballer (Worcester City, Luton Town, national team).
  - Rose Dugdale, 82, English paramilitary leader (Provisional IRA).
  - Peter Glover, 78, English rugby union player (Bath, Harrogate, national team). (death announced on this date)
- 20 March – Phil Lowe, 74, English rugby league player (Hull Kingston Rovers, Manly Sea Eagles, national team) and coach (York Wasps). (death announced on this date)
- 22 March – Peter Bennett, 77, English footballer (Leyton Orient, West Ham United).
- 27 March
  - George Gilbey, 40, English television personality (Gogglebox) and reality show contestant (Celebrity Big Brother).
  - David Jackson, 87, English footballer (Bradford City, Tranmere Rovers, Halifax Town). (death announced on this date)
- 29 March – Gerry Conway, 76, English drummer and percussionist (Jethro Tull, Fairport Convention, Cat Stevens).
- 31 March – Paul Bence, 75, English football player (Brentford, Reading) and manager (Wycombe Wanderers). (death announced on this date)

=== April ===
- 3 April – Adrian Schiller, 60, English actor (Victoria, The Last Kingdom, The Danish Girl).
- 5 April – John Louis, 83, English motorcycle speedway rider. (death announced on this date)
- 6 April – Dickie Rooks, 83, English football player (Middlesbrough, Bristol City, Sunderland) and manager.
- 9 April –
  - Dave Mehmet, 63, English football player (Millwall, Gillingham) and manager. (death announced on this date)
  - Toby Simkin, 59, English theatrical producer. (death announced on this date)
- 15 April – Derek Underwood, 78, English cricketer (Kent, national team), complications from dementia.
- 18 April – Raman Subba Row, 92, English cricketer (Surrey, Northamptonshire, national team). (death announced on this date)
- 20 April – Sir Andrew Davis, 80, English conductor.
- 24 April – Mike Pinder, 82, English Hall of Fame musician (The Moody Blues) and songwriter ("The Best Way to Travel", "A Simple Game").
- 25 April – Bob Appleby, 84, English footballer (Middlesbrough).

=== May ===
- 1 May
  - Terry Medwin, 91, Welsh football player (Swansea City, Tottenham Hotspur, national team) and manager.
  - Ian Mellor, 74, English footballer (Manchester City, Brighton, Sheffield Wednesday), amyloidosis.
  - Richard Tandy, 76, English Hall of Fame musician (Electric Light Orchestra, The Move).
- 2 May
  - Josh Baker, 20, English cricketer (Worcestershire).
  - Peter Oosterhuis, 75, English golfer and broadcaster (CBS Sports), complications from Alzheimer's disease.
- 5 May –
  - Bernard Hill, 79, English actor (The Lord of the Rings, Titanic, Boys from the Blackstuff).
  - Phil Hoadley, 72, English footballer (Orient, Norwich City, Crystal Palace).
- 6 May –
  - Kristin Hallenga, 38, English breast cancer awareness activist (CoppaFeel!). (death announced on this date)
  - Phil Hoadley, 72, English footballer (Orient, Norwich City, Crystal Palace).
- 8 May –
  - Viv Busby, 74, English football player (Luton Town, Fulham) and manager (Hartlepool United). (death announced on this date)
  - Paul Holmes, 56, English footballer (Torquay United, Everton, West Bromwich Albion). (death announced on this date)
- 15 May – John Hawken, 84, English keyboardist (The Nashville Teens, Renaissance, Strawbs).
- 16 May – Barry Kemp, 83–84, English archaeologist and egyptologist. (death announced on this date)
- 19 May – Ian Hamilton, 73, English footballer (Aston Villa, Sheffield United, Minnesota Kicks). (death announced on this date)
- 24 May – Derek Morgan, 88, Welsh-English rugby union player (Northumberland, England national team).
- 26 May – Georgie Campbell, 37, British equestrian, horse riding accident.
- 29 May – Ron Ayers, 92, English engineer (ThrustSSC, JCB Dieselmax).
- 30 May – Geoff Follin, 58, English video game composer (Silver Surfer, Plok!, Rock n' Roll Racing). (death announced on this date)

=== June ===
- 2 June – Rob Burrow, 41, English rugby league footballer.
- 3 June – William Russell, 99, English actor (Doctor Who, The Adventures of Sir Lancelot, The Great Escape).
- 10 June –
  - Terry Allcock, 88, English footballer (Bolton Wanderers, Norwich City) and cricketer (Norfolk).
  - Willie Carlin, 83, English footballer (Halifax Town, Carlisle United, Derby County).
- 13 June –
  - Tommy Banks, 94, English footballer (Bolton Wanderers, Altrincham, national team). (death announced on this date)
  - Kate Rackham, teacher and charity campaigner. (death reported on this date)
- 15 June –
  - Kevin Campbell, 54, English footballer (Arsenal, Nottingham Forest, Everton). (death announced on this date)
  - Frank D'Arcy, 77, English footballer (Everton, Tranmere Rovers, Kirkby Town).
  - Matija Šarkić, 26, English-born Montenegrin footballer (Shrewsbury Town, Millwall, national team).
- 17 June –
  - Brian Makepeace, 92, English footballer (Doncaster Rovers, Boston United). (death announced on this date)
  - Paul Spencer, 53, English musician (Dario G).
- 27 June – Sir Jack Petchey, 98, English football executive and philanthropist, chairman of Watford (1987–1994).
- 28 June – Joss Naylor, 88, English fell runner.
- 29 June – Johnny Cooke, 89, English boxer, pneumonia.
- 30 June – Peter Collins, 73, English record producer (Power Windows, Operation: Mindcrime, These Days). (death announced on this date)

=== July ===
- 1 July – Jack Rowell, 87, English rugby union coach (Bath, national team) and executive.
- 2 July – Jeff Whitefoot, 90, English footballer (Nottingham Forest, Manchester United, Grimsby Town). (death announced on this date)
- 4 July –
  - Ysanne Churchman, 99, English actress (The Archers, Doctor Who).
  - Tony Knight, 54, English comedian.
- 6 July – Dudley Roberts, 78, English footballer (Coventry City, Mansfield Town, Scunthorpe United). (death announced on this date)
- 7 July – Rachel Wyatt, 94, English-Canadian dramatist.
- 16 July – April Cantelo, 96, English soprano.
- 17 July – Heather Wood, 79, English folk singer (The Young Tradition). (death announced on this date)
- 19 July – Ron Stockin, 93, English footballer (Wolverhampton Wanderers, Cardiff City, Grimsby Town). (death announced on this date)
- 22 July – John Mayall, 90, English blues and rock musician.
- 23 July – Barry Reed, 86, English cricketer (Hampshire, MCC). (death announced on this date)
- 24 July – Fred Potter, 83, English footballer (Aston Villa, Doncaster Rovers, Hereford United). (death announced on this date)
- 27 July – Kenneth Standring, 89, English cricketer (Lancashire). (death announced on this date)

=== August ===
- 1 August – Craig Shakespeare, 60, English football player (Walsall, West Bromwich Albion) and manager (Leicester City).
- 2 August – Paul Darling, 64, English barrister, chairman of the Levy Board (since 2020).
- 3 August – Sir Ernest Hall, 94, English businessman, pianist and composer.
- 5 August – Graham Thorpe, 55, English cricketer (Surrey, national team).
- 7 August – Neil Stanley, 56, English cricketer (Bedfordshire, Northamptonshire).
- 8 August – Alan Little, 69, English football player (Southend United, Barnsley) and manager (York City). (death announced on this date)
- 12 August – Roy Greaves, 77, English footballer (Bolton Wanderers, Seattle Sounders, Rochdale).
- 13 August – Charles Hughes, 91, English football coach and director (English FA). (death announced on this date)
- 21 August –
  - David Anfam, 69, English art historian, curator.
  - Russell Stone, 77–78, English singer (R&J Stone).
- 22 August – Rodney Smithson, 80, English football player (Oxford United, Arsenal) and manager (Witney Town). (death announced on this date)
- 24 August – Stephen E. Thorpe, 54, English-born New Zealand entomologist.
- 26 August – Alexander Goehr, 92, English composer and academic.
- 27 August – Richard Macphail, 73, English musician (Anon), road manager (Genesis) and businessman.
- 30 August –
  - Nicky Gavron, 82, British politician, deputy mayor of London (2000–2003, 2004–2008).
  - Danielle Moore, 52, English musician (Crazy P).
- 31 August – Phil Swern, 76, English radio producer (Sounds of the 60s, Pick of the Pops).

=== September ===
- 1 September – Brian Trueman, 92, English television presenter (ITV Granada) and writer (Danger Mouse, Count Duckula).
- 3 September – Clive Freeman, 61, English footballer (Swansea City, Altrincham, Doncaster Rovers). (death announced on this date)
- 4 September – David Rose, 81, English club secretary (Ipswich Town F.C.). (death announced on this date)
- 5 September –
  - Derek Boshier, 87, English pop artist.
  - Herbie Flowers, 86, English musician (Blue Mink, T. Rex, Sky).
- 8 September –
  - Zoot Money, 82, English vocalist and keyboardist (Eric Burdon and The Animals, Zoot Money's Big Roll Band).
  - Ben Thapa, 42, English opera singer (G4).
- 11 September – Kenneth Cope, 93, English actor (Randall and Hopkirk (Deceased), Coronation Street).
- 15 September –
  - Geoffrey Hinsliff, 86, English actor (Coronation Street, Brass, Doctor Who).
  - Gary Shaw, 63, English footballer (Aston Villa, Kjøbenhavns Boldklub, Shrewsbury Town).
- 16 September –
  - Norman Ackroyd, 86, English visual artist.
  - Steve Hardwick, 68, English footballer (Oxford United, Huddersfield Town, Newcastle United).
- 20 September
  - David Graham, 99, English actor (Doctor Who, Thunderbirds, Peppa Pig, Ben and Holly's Little Kingdom).
  - Cleo Sylvestre, 79, English actress (Till Death Us Do Part, Crossroads, The Bill).
- 21 September – Chris Jones, 84, English rock climber and writer. (death announced on this date)
- 23 September – Rupert Keegan, 69, English racing driver (Formula One, CART).
- 27 September – Dame Maggie Smith, 89, English actress (The Prime of Miss Jean Brodie, California Suite, Harry Potter).
- 28 September – Barry Lloyd, 75, English footballer (Fulham, Chelsea) and manager (Yeovil Town). (death announced on this date)

=== October ===
- 2 October – Richard Woodman, 80, English novelist and naval historian.
- 9 October – George Baldock, 31, English-born Greek footballer (Milton Keynes Dons, Sheffield United, Greece national team), drowned. (body discovered on this date)
- 10 October – Brian Lockwood, 78, English rugby league footballer (Castleford, Hull Kingston Rovers, national team).
- 16 October – Liam Payne, 31, English singer (One Direction).
- 21 October – Paul Di'Anno, 66, English heavy metal singer (Iron Maiden) and songwriter ("Running Free"). (death announced on this date)
- 22 October –
  - Graham Blyth, 76, English audio engineer.
- Robert Willis, 77, English Anglican priest, dean of Hereford (1992–2000) and Canterbury (2001–2022).
- 31 October –
  - Alastair Down, 68, English journalist and broadcaster (Racing Post, Channel 4 Racing).
  - Trevor Whymark, 74, English footballer (Ipswich Town, Grimsby Town, national team).

=== November ===
- 8 November – June Spencer, 105, English actress, (The Archers)
- 13 November – Brian Maxine, 86, English wrestler and cabaret artist.
- 14 November –
  - Keith Hepworth, 82, English rugby league player (Castleford, Leeds, Hull F.C.) and coach. (death announced on this date)
  - Peter Sinfield, 80, English lyricist ("21st Century Schizoid Man", "I Believe in Father Christmas"), musician (King Crimson), and record producer.
- 15 November – Graham Bailey, 104, English footballer (Huddersfield Town, Sheffield United).
- 18 November – J. Saul Kane, 55, English DJ and musician. (death announced on this date)
- 21 November – Ray Smith, 90, English footballer (Hull City, Peterborough United, Northampton Town).
- 25 November – John Tinniswood, 112, English supercentenarian, world's oldest man (since 2024).
- 26 November – Paul Dickenson, 74, English Olympic hammer thrower (1976, 1980) and sports commentator.
- 27 November – Brian Jackson, 91, English cricketer (Derbyshire). (death announced on this date)

=== December ===
- 4 December – Tony Young, 71, English footballer (Manchester United, Charlton Athletic, York City). (death announced on this date)
- 11 December – Syd Hynes, 80, English rugby league player and coach (Leeds Rhinos). (death announced on this date)
- 12 December –
  - Norman Bodell, 86, English football player (Crewe Alexandra, Rochdale) and manager (Barrow). (death announced on this date)
  - Vic Gomersall, 82, English footballer (Swansea City, Manchester City). (death announced on this date)
  - Duncan Norvelle, 66, English comedian.
- 18 December – Tony Bentley, 84, English footballer (Southend United).
- 20 December – George Eastham, 88, English footballer (Arsenal, Stoke City, national team).
- 27 December – Mickey Bullock, 78, English footballer (Leyton Orient, Halifax Town, Oxford United). (death announced on this date)
- 30 December – Michael Newberry, 27, English footballer (Víkingur Ólafsvík, Linfield, Cliftonville).
- 31 December – Johnnie Walker, 79, English DJ (Radio Caroline, BBC Radio 1, BBC Radio 2), lung disease.

== See also ==
- 2024 in Northern Ireland
- 2024 in Scotland
- 2024 in Wales
