= Murder 24/7 =

British true crime documentary series

Murder 24/7 is a British true crime documentary series. The first series aired on BBC Two for five episodes between 24 February and 3 March 2020. A second series began on the same channel on 16 June 2025. The first series focused on Essex Police, and the second on West Mercia Police.

== Reception ==
Ellis Whitehouse of Essex newspaper The Echo, who had covered the trials of the cases from the first series, found it "enlightening" that the series showed incidents that he had heard about in court. He was interested in how perpetrators acted in police custody, compared to how they had acted in court.

In a three-star review in The Daily Telegraph in 2020, Anita Singh praised the detail and access to police investigations. She criticised that little was said about the victim, causing a lack of emotional investment; she theorised this could have been deliberate, as the deceased was a drug dealer.

Writing in The i Paper, Gerard Gilbert gave a four-star review to the 2025 series. He found the footage of the manhunt to be exciting, but the police interviews to be less interesting. Gilbert was disappointed that the documentary did not investigate the motive for the murder of Aurman Singh.
