= Festifeel =

Charity music festival in England

Coordinates: 51.5387°N 0.0580°W

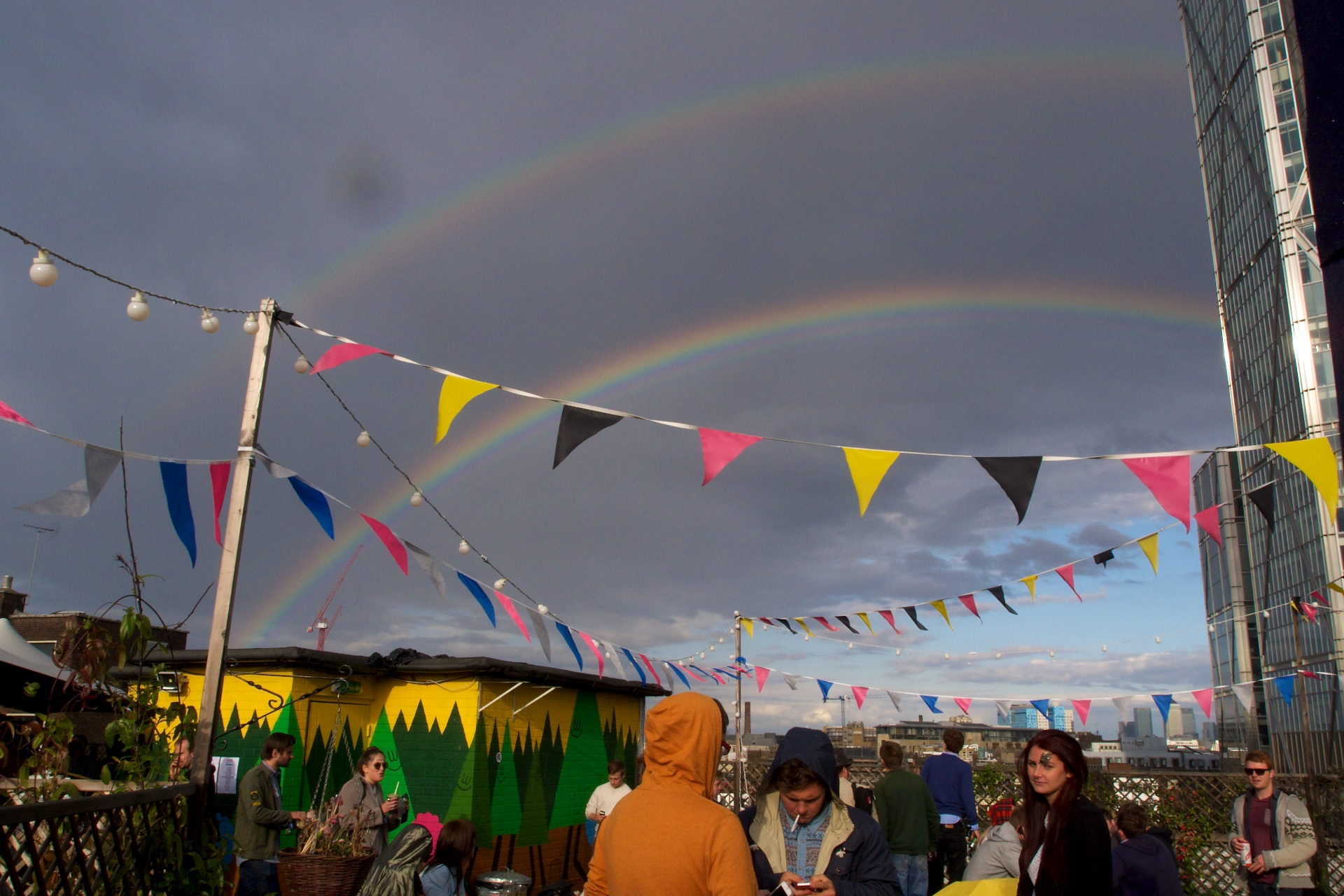
Festifeel 2012

Festifeel is an annual British charity music festival held to raise money for breast cancer awareness. The festival is organised by the English breast cancer charity CoppaFeel!. It describes itself as "Britain's only boutique music festival with boobs in mind".

After a seven year break between 2015 and 2021, Festifeel was revived in September 2022. Hosted at Omera, 600 people had joined CoppaFeel! to chat boobs and fundraise for the charity.

Festifeel hasn't happened since 2022 but it continues to be active. While the next one is expected soon, as of January 2026, no information about dates or ticket details are available.

"There were two stages headlined by the band McFly, and Festifeel raised £32k through ticket sales, sponsorship and donations at the event. For the main stage BSL signers accompanied the acts and provided live interpretation for the event."

== History ==
=== 2014 ===
Festifeel 2014 took place at the London Fields Brewery on 21 June 2014. Fearne Cotton was once again the festival's curator.

=== 2013 ===
Festifeel 2013 took place on 15 June at the Islington Metal Works, London. Fearne Cotton was the festival's curator. Huffington Post listed Festifeel as one of their 'Gigs to look out for' during 2013.

Lineup

- Maverick Sabre
- Tribes
- The Milk
- MistaJam
- Gemma Cairney
- Gabrielle Aplin
- Lewis Watson
- Rae Morris
- Abandoman
- DJ Count Sizzle
- The Harlots
- A.J. Holmes
- Gaoler's Daughter
- DJ Cuddles
- JP Cooperfest

=== 2012 ===
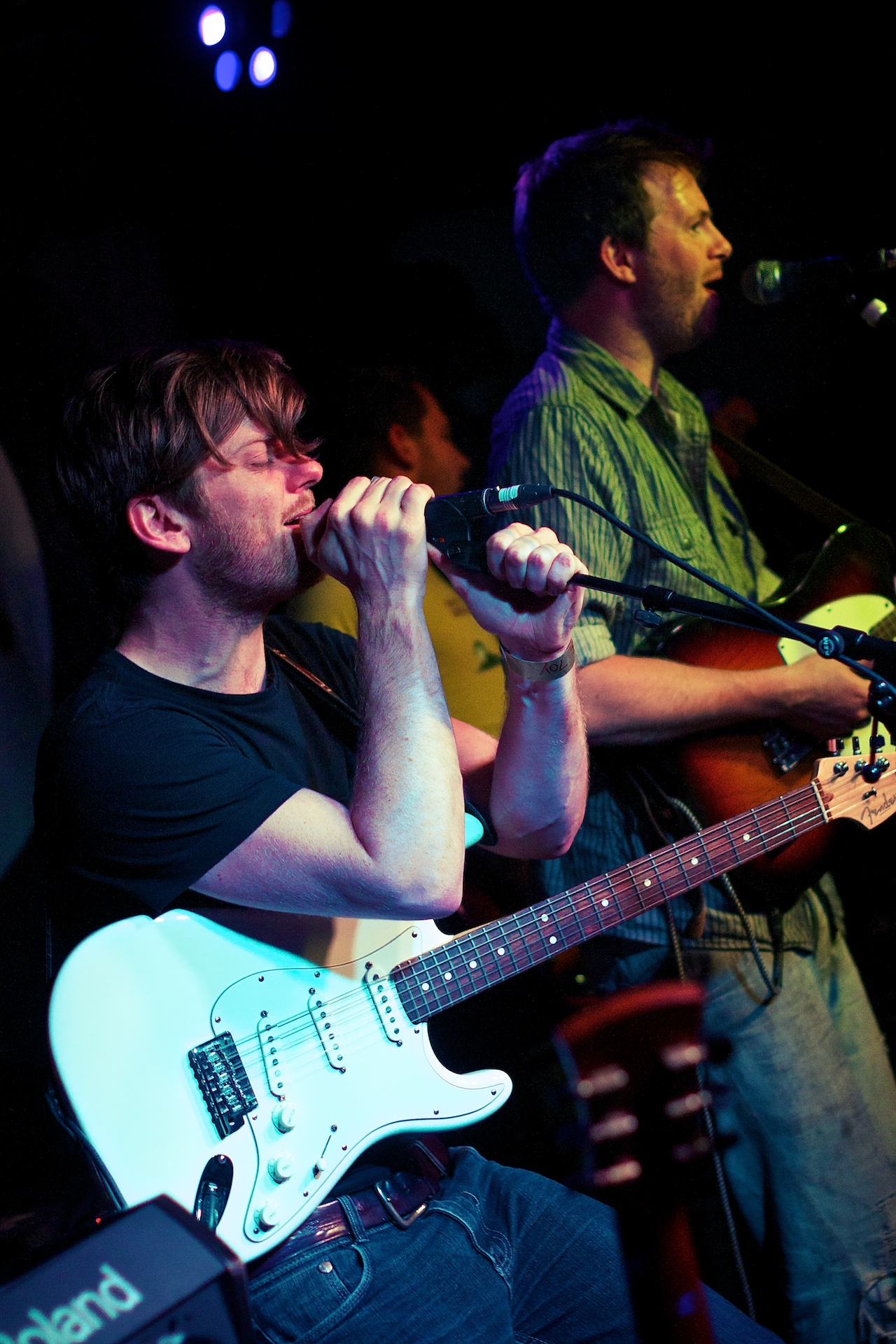
Yes Sir Boss performing at the 2012 festival

In 2012 the festival was held on 4 June at the Queen of Hoxton, Shoreditch and curated by Fearne Cotton. The View were headlining.

Lineup

- Lianne La Havas
- The Milk
- The View
- Norman Jay
- Dog is Dead
- Chew Lips
- Newton Faulkner
- Snow Club
- Goldierocks
- Jennifer Left
- Angus Stone
- Yadi
- Jen Long
- Among Brothers
- Blood Red Shoes DJ Set
- Jamie N Commons
- Cut Ribbons
- Yes Sir Boss
- The Castells
- Holly Walker
- Lazy Habits
- Will Robert
- Draper

=== 2011 ===
On 1 May 2011 Noah and the Whale headlined the festival at Monto Water Rats in King Cross.

Lineup

- Noah and the Whale
- Norman Jay
- Cloud Control
- theCocknbullkid
- Diagram of the Heart
- Daley
- The Milk
- Summer Camp
- The Castells
- Cymbals
- Little Comets
- Charlie Simpson
- Dub Smugglers DJs
- Stop Look Listen

=== 2010 ===
On 2 May 2010 Newton Faulkner headlined the festival at Monto Water Rats in King Cross.

Lineup

- Newton Faulkner
- Babyhead
- Trojan Soundsystem
- Dub Smugglers DJs
- Citadels
- The High Wire
- Come On Gang
- Pepe Belmonte
- Emily Barker
- Ian M Hale
- I Dream In Colour
- Rigolo
- Ute Lake
- Sophie Madeleine
