= 2024 Hainault sword attack =

Stabbing in London

- Location: Hainault, London, England
- Date: 30 April 2024 c. 07:00 – c. 07:22 (BST)
- Attack type: Slashing, stabbing, vehicle-ramming attack
- Weapons: Samurai sword; Van
- Deaths: 1
- Injuries: 5 (including the perpetrator)
- Victim: Daniel Anjorin
- Perpetrator: Marcus Arduini Monzo
- Motive: Psychotic break brought about by cannabis abuse
- Convictions: Murder (One count); Attempted murder (Three counts); Wounding with intent (One count); Aggravated burglary (One count); Possession of a bladed article (One count)

On 30 April 2024, a man crashed a van into a pedestrian and property in the suburban area of Hainault, London, United Kingdom, before randomly attacking people with a sword. A 14-year-old boy, Daniel Anjorin, was killed, and four others were injured, including two police officers. A 36-year-old man, Marcus Arduini Monzo, was arrested at the scene after being struck by several Taser rounds and tackled to the ground by more responding police officers. On 25 June 2025, Monzo was convicted of offences including murder and three attempted murders. He was sentenced two days later to life imprisonment with a minimum term of 40 years.

== Attack ==
On 30 April 2024, between 06:50 and 07:00, residents of Hainault reported hearing screaming and shouting in the street and police were called. Around this time, a man in a yellow hoodie had crashed a van into a property, also hitting a pedestrian, whereupon bystanders approached the vehicle under the assumption an accident had occurred. The attacker, who was injured in the crash, exited the van and asked a woman where he was before pulling a sword from his trousers and proceeding to slash at the neck of the man he had hit with the vehicle, yelling that he was going to kill him.

Following this, the attacker forced his way into a family home and attacked a 35-year-old man as he slept in his bed. The man's hand was seriously injured and he lost large amounts of blood. Relatives of the man credited him with protecting his family from the attacker.

The attacker then left the home and approached 14-year old Daniel Anjorin from behind as the boy walked to school. Residents attempted to warn Anjorin of the danger, but witnesses said that he had headphones on, and so likely could not hear them. The attacker slashed the boy's neck from behind and then stabbed him in the chest, fatally wounding him. Two police officers arrived at the scene and approached the attacker to try and subdue him, but he fled down a nearby alleyway, slashing a female officer as he did so.

Throughout the spree, the attacker climbed over the gardens and garages of residents to evade police. Witnesses said that the man was shouting and swearing, with video footage that captured the attacker shouting "Is there anybody here who believes in God?".

At around 07:22, further police officers were able to confront the attacker in a resident's driveway. Multiple Tasers were deployed against the attacker and he was tackled to the ground and arrested by a large number of police officers.

== Victims ==
One victim was killed and four others were injured. A 33-year-old man was wounded after being struck by a van driven by the attacker and sustaining a blade wound to the neck; a 35-year-old man was attacked in a property, receiving laceration wounds to his arm; a 14-year-old boy was stabbed in the neck and chest with the sword and later died of his injuries in hospital; while confronting the suspect, a male police officer suffered a serious hand injury, which required surgery; and a female police officer who also confronted the suspect was seriously injured in the arm, which required surgery. The 14-year-old victim later was identified as Daniel Anjorin. He attended Bancroft's School in Woodford Green, the same school that was attended by Grace O'Malley-Kumar, who was fatally stabbed in Nottingham the previous year. Before committing the attack, Monzo killed and skinned his pet cat.

== Perpetrator ==
Marcus Aurelio Arduini Monzo (born 11 April 1988) was arrested at the scene after being struck by several Taser rounds and tackled to the ground by police. Born to a Brazilian father and Spanish mother in Astorga, Paraná, Brazil. Monzo is a dual Spanish-Brazilian national who moved to Newham, east London in 2013 and described himself on social media as a "mystic and musician". He was pictured wearing several medals that were won from a Brazilian jiu-jitsu competition. Monzo is said to have not been known to any of the victims. The attack was not targeted or terror-related.

On 1 May 2024, Monzo was charged with the murder of Daniel Anjorin, two counts of attempted murder, two counts of grievous bodily harm, aggravated burglary, and possession of a bladed article. He appeared at Westminster Magistrates' Court on 2 May and later at the Old Bailey on 7 May and 23 July. These charges were later amended to one count of murder, four counts of attempted murder, one count of wounding with intent, one count of aggravated burglary and three counts of possession of a bladed article. On 2 May 2025, Monzo pleaded guilty to two out of the three counts of possession of a bladed article, admitting to the possession of a katana and tanto sword but denying the charge relating to possession of a kitchen knife, as well as all other charges. A trial date for the remaining offences was scheduled for June.

On 25 June 2025, Monzo was found guilty at the Old Bailey of murdering 14-year-old Anjorin, three counts of attempted murder, one count of wounding with intent (replacing the fourth attempted murder charge), aggravated burglary, and possession of a bladed article. Following the verdict, Kirsty O'Connor, of the Crown Prosecution Service, said that Monzo's mental state "was driven by his own cannabis misuse, which meant that he was fully responsible for the devastation he caused. The jury, by their unequivocal verdicts, have accepted the prosecution case." He was sentenced on 27 June 2025 to life imprisonment with a minimum term of 40 years. This was reduced to 38 years and 309 days due to the time he had already served on remand.

== Aftermath ==
On 5 May 2024, around 300 people gathered at the car park of Hainault tube station to attend a vigil for Daniel Anjorin.

During the Premier League match between Arsenal and Bournemouth at the Emirates Stadium, fans paid tribute to Daniel Anjorin, who was a supporter of Arsenal. In the 14th minute, supporters held up a banner with 'RIP Daniel' on it followed by a round of applause.
