= Sophie Madeleine =

English musician

- Born: Sophie Ball
- Origin: Brighton, England
- Occupation: Singer-songwriter / copywriter
- Instruments: Ukulele, vocals, guitar
- Years active: 2009–2014
- Labels: Xtra Mile Recordings
- Website: sophiemadeleine.com

Sophie Madeleine (born Sophie Ball) is a ukulele player from Brighton. She released three solo albums; her third album, Silent Cynic, was released on 1 November 2013 after a crowdfunding campaign on PledgeMusic.

== Career ==
Madeleine graduated from Bath Spa University with a BA in Commercial Music and a master's degree in Songwriting. While at Bath Spa, she was in the band Oriole.

She wrote her first ukulele song, "Take Your Love With Me," for her then-boyfriend who had bought her that first ukulele. She also plays tenor guitar. She produced her first album as a final year project at Bath Spa. A song from her first album, "You Are My Favourite," was released as a charity single to raise money for Macmillan Cancer Support in memory of her father Ben, with a video featuring people from around the world who filmed themselves playing the song.

Her second album, The Rhythm You Started, was self-produced at home, and then mixed by Danton Supple. It was released online in 2010. For 30 days in 2011 before the "official" CD release, Madeleine released a video every day of her performing a different cover song, including such disparate songs as "Pure Imagination" and "Pumped Up Kicks."

While living in Bath, she met Hannah Rockcliffe (Hannah-Rei) with whom she formed the comedy-song duo Rocky and Balls, posting videos together on YouTube and recording one album in 2011.

Her third solo album was recorded in a studio in Brooklyn, the first to be entirely studio-based, which she described as "one of the most stressful experiences of my life". She published The Official Sophie Madeleine Ukulele Tab Book in 2013.

She became a copywriter at a Brighton-based advertising company in late 2014.

In 2015 she announced her retirement from music.

=== Performances ===
She supported Gruff Rhys, the lead singer of Super Furry Animals, on tour. In 2010, she performed at FestiFeel! along with Newton Faulkner and Babyhead to raise awareness of breast cancer and she performed at The Great Escape Festival's launch.

== Reception ==
Madeleine's success on YouTube has led to her being called an "internet sensation". Her music is covered by other artists so often that Finger magazine crowned her "Queen of the Ukulele". She has over four million views on her YouTube channel.

Frank Turner is a fan of Madeleine's and has played her single "Oil and Gold" on his Steve Lamacq's BBC Radio 2 show. Brighton Source wrote that Madeleine's second album, The Rhythm You Started, is "a ray of sunshine every time we press play". The magazine Computer Music ran a full-page feature on Madeleine in its 2010 "How To Make It in Music" February special.

=== Internationally ===
On 8 July 2010 "Take Your Love With Me (The Ukulele Song)" reached number 4 on iTunes' New Zealand Singer-Songwriter Music Chart. In 2012, Madeleine was interviewed on a Portuguese television documentary about ukuleles called Apanhei-te cavaquinho, for RTP2, where she also performed her song "Take Your Love With Me (The Ukulele Song)". Madeleine appeared on MTV Brasil in a short feature dedicated to her career.

=== Soundtracks ===
Her songs have been used on the soundtracks of several TV advertisements, notably on adverts for Postbank (You Make Me Happy), Pets at Home (You Make Me Happy), Macy's (Take Your Love With Me) and A1 Telekom Austria (One Fine Day). Her music has also been used on the soundtrack for the BBC programme The Great British Home Movie Roadshow in a segment featuring Spike Milligan.

In 2025, Madeleine's cover of "Bring Me Sunshine" was featured in the DCU's Superman reboot.

== Discography ==
=== Albums ===
- Love. Life. Ukulele (Xtra Mile Recordings, 2009)
- We Like Cake And Beards And Stuff – Rocky and Balls (self-released, May 2011)
- The Rhythm You Started (Xtra Mile Recordings, 2011)
- Silent Cynic (2013)
