= List of storms named Bert =

The name Bert has been used for one tropical cyclone and one extratropical cyclone worldwide.

In the Australian region:

- Cyclone Bert-Christelle (1980), a severe Category 3 tropical cyclone which crossed into the Indian Ocean

In Europe:

- Storm Bert (2024), a powerful extratropical cyclone which affected the British Isles
