= London Fields Brewery =

Brewery in the fields of London

Coordinates: 51.5387°N 0.0580°W

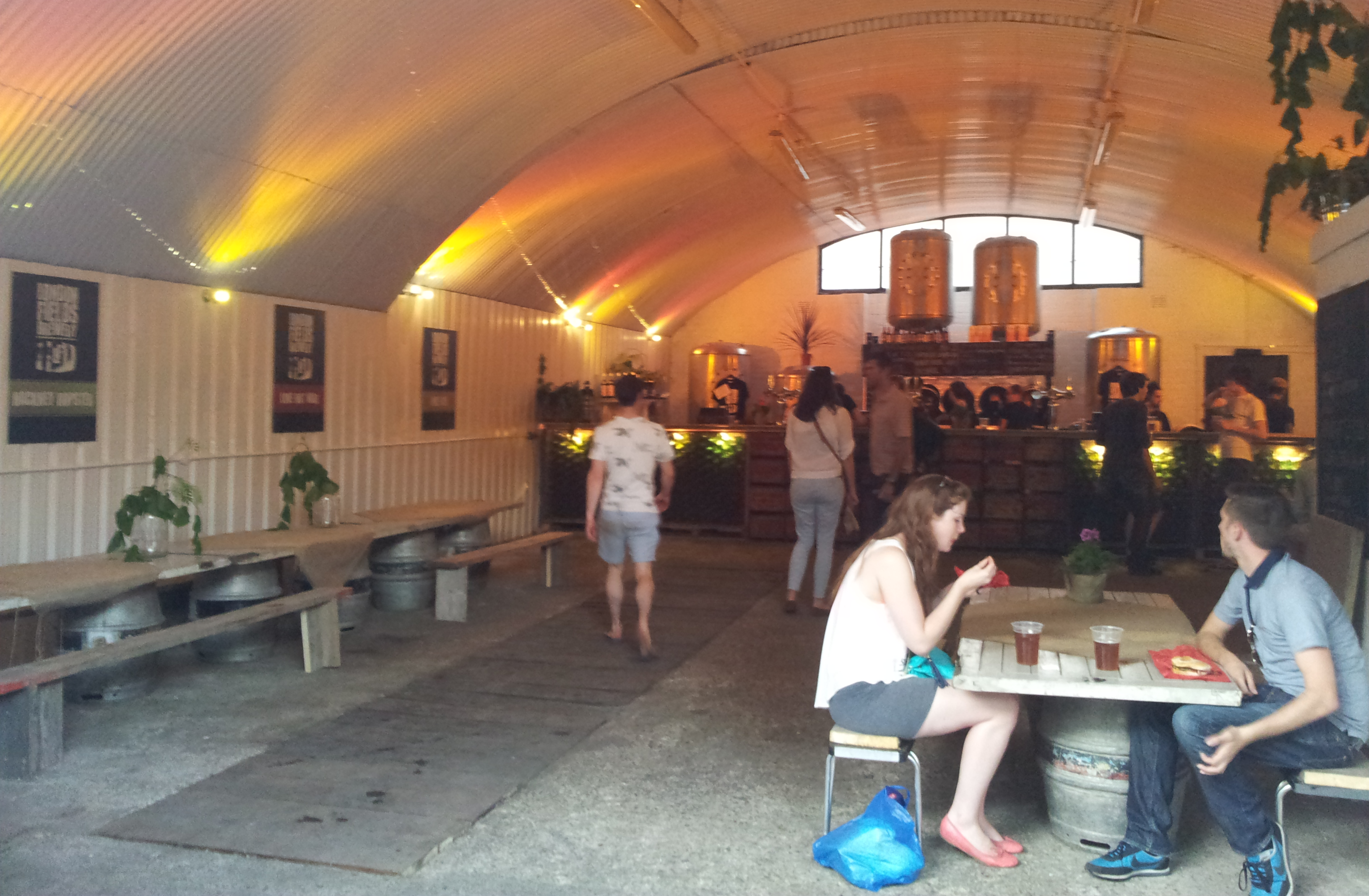
- Trade name: London Fields Brewery
- Industry: Manufacture of beer (UK SIC Classification 2007)
- Founded: 2011
- Headquarters: London, E8; United Kingdom,
- Owners: Grace Land Group
- Website: https://www.londonfieldsbrewery.co.uk

London Fields Brewery was a brewery in the London Fields area of the London Borough of Hackney, London. It was founded in 2011 with significant success riding the wave of new craft beers, though by December 2014 the company had fallen into trouble following the arrest of co-founder Julian de Vere Whiteway-Wilkinson, on suspicion of tax evasion. In 2017, London Fields Brewery was purchased in a joint-venture by Brooklyn Brewery and Carlsberg UK with plans to bring brewing back onsite. In 2023 Grace Land Group acquired London Fields Brewery from Carlsberg.

== History ==
The brewery opened on 27 August 2011, at 374 Helmsley Place. It was the first commercial brewery to open in Hackney since the 19th century. Five beers were produced, named: Hackney Hopster, London Fields Bitter, London Fields Session Ale, London Fields Gold and Love Not War. Love Not War received especially favourable press due to its significance in relation to the London riots. It was promoted as "first brewed barricaded in the brewery during the London riots".

Alongside distribution of its products throughout London, the brewery has worked alongside entertainment companies to produce events in London. These included Background Cinema, Elsewhere Festival, and Festifeel.

The brewery was founded by Julian de Vere Whiteway-Wilkinson and Ian Burges, around the time of the 2011 London riots, with approximately £10,000 of capital. Prior to founding the brewery, Whiteway had been jailed for 12 years for his part in a cocaine smuggling organisations. When founding the company, Whiteway still owed the Crown £3.2 million, including £1.2 million in interest.

The court granted Whiteway permission to create the company as a way to repay the courts whilst rehabilitating into a legitimate career, however, he was ordered to pay back £500 a month throughout this time. Whiteway's lawyer argued that a stay in repayments would allow his client to grow his capital more quickly, and asked the court to allow the company to fulfil export orders to 14 countries. As of December 2014, neither of these requests had been granted.

On 3 December 2014, Whiteway was arrested on suspicion of cheating HMRC in respect of VAT. On the same day, the brewery was searched, and a forklift truck was used by HMRC to remove equipment and stock. According to Whiteway, by 2014, both he and his wife were joint shareholders in the company, but presiding District Judge Elizabeth Roscoe was not convinced of this, asking to see evidence of "ownership and set-up", as promises of future payment "were often not fulfilled".

In July 2017, London Fields Brewery was acquired by a joint venture between Carlsberg Group and Brooklyn Brewery for a reported £4m.

On 7 December 2021, the brewery announced that it was closing down immediately with a view to selling the business.

In May 2023, Grace Land Group acquired London Fields Brewery from Carlsberg.

== See also ==
- List of microbreweries
