= CoppaFeel! =

British breast cancer awareness charity

- Formation: April 2009; 17 years ago
- Founder: Kristin Hallenga and Maren Hallenga
- Founded at: London
- Type: Charitable organisation
- Purpose: To give everyone the best possible chance of surviving breast cancer by speaking to young people in their natural habitat.
- Headquarters: 1-4 Pope Street, London SE1 3PR
- Location: London
- Coordinates: 51.499970°N 0.078370°W
- Region served: United Kingdom
- Official language: English
- Key people: Natalie Kelly (CEO)
- Staff: 15
- Website: coppafeel.org

CoppaFeel! is a breast cancer awareness charity based in London focused on promoting early detection of breast cancer by encouraging young people to regularly check their chests.

== History ==
CoppaFeel! was founded in 2009 by sisters Maren and Kristin Hallenga, after Kristin was diagnosed with breast cancer at age 23. Despite a family history of cancer, doctors originally dismissed a lump on Kristin's breast as “hormonal”.

Driven by the difficult experience, the Hallenga sisters launched CoppaFeel! at Beach Break Live in 2009.

== Mission and values ==
CoppaFeel!'s awareness campaigns are based on increased physical self-awareness and monitoring one's breasts in the hopes of quickly detecting any changes. Most campaign work is carried out at universities, music festivals, schools and work places and via national awareness campaigns around the UK. CoppaFeel!'s ambassadors, called 'the Boobettes', are young women who experienced breast cancer at a young age.

== Campaigns ==
In Summer 2014, the organization launched the ‘What Normal Feels Like’ campaign, seeking to reclaim language and imagery associated with breasts. Hundreds of women submitted pictures of their breasts, along with a descriptive word such as “wibbly” or “springy”, later used in a series of advertisements designed to normalise and desexualise female breasts.

CoppaFeel! ran a ‘Cheknominate’ campaign, a “healthier” take on the Neknominate craze. Cheknominate encouraged people to record themselves checking their breasts before nominating a friend to do the same. The Huffington Post were supportive of the campaign, and encouraged their readers to use the hashtag #Cheknominate on social media.

== Media coverage ==
Many of Coppafeel!’s publicity campaigns have involved the use of giant inflatable ‘boob’ costumes. CoppaFeel! gained widespread media coverage after decorating The Angel of the North with a ‘boob hijack’ sticker.

In 2015, CoppaFeel! founder Kristin Hallenga was profiled in Kris: Dying to Live, a documentary about her battle with terminal breast cancer. She also played herself in The C Word, a BBC One adaptation of the book by cancer blogger Lisa Lynch.

== Festifeel ==
CoppaFeel! hosts the annual music festival, Festifeel, helping to raise money for breast cancer awareness. It describes itself as "Britain's only boutique music festival with boobs in mind!".

== Celebrity support ==
The organization's fundraising activities have received support from celebrities, including Fearne Cotton, Russell Howard, Newton Faulkner, Lorraine Kelly and Dannii Minogue.

Radio presenters Greg James and Dermot O'Leary ran the 2013 Bath Half Marathon wearing giant inflatable "boobs" in support of CoppaFeel!

Gavin & Stacey star Mathew Horne appeared in a cinema campaign for Coppafeel!, encouraging viewers to check their boobs before the film started.

In September 2012, Mel B posed topless in a Coppafeel! advert in Cosmopolitan magazine ahead of breast cancer awareness month. The advert's risqué nature received mass-media coverage.
