= Kristin Hallenga =

English columnist and philanthropist (1985–2024)

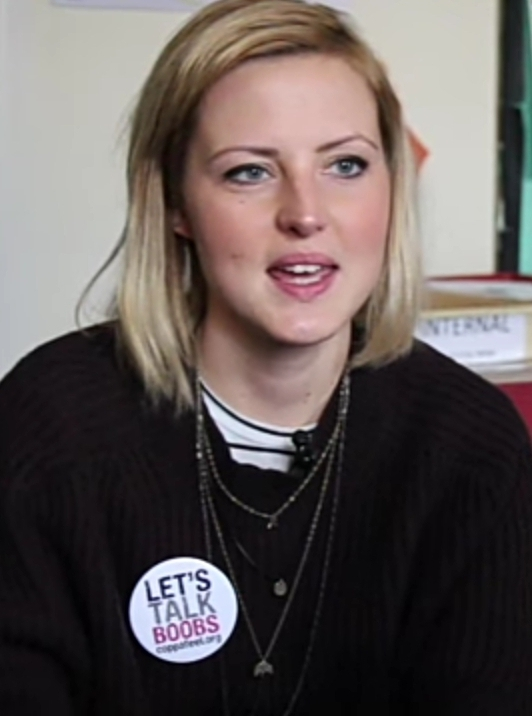
- Hallenga in 2015

Chief Executive Officer of CoppaFeel!
- In office April 2009 – January 2017
- Succeeded by: Natalie Haskell

Personal details
- Born: 11 November 1985 Norden, Lower Saxony, West Germany
- Died: 4 May 2024 (aged 38) Newquay, Cornwall, England
- Occupation: Columnist, philanthropist
- Website: howtoglitteraturd.com (about her memoir)

Kristin Hallenga (11 November 1985 – 4 May 2024) was a West German-born British columnist and philanthropist. Diagnosed with breast cancer in 2009, when she was 23, she became an activist for raising awareness about the disease among young people and founded the charity CoppaFeel!.

== Biography ==
Kristin Hallenga and twin sister Maren Hallenga were born to a German father and English mother in Norden, Lower Saxony, West Germany on 11 November 1985. Her parents divorced when she was nine, and her mother returned to England with Hallenga and her two sisters, where they lived in Daventry, Northamptonshire. She was an honorary graduate of Nottingham Trent University. Hallenga was profiled in Kris: Dying to Live, a documentary that covered her experience with terminal breast cancer. In 2009, she won a Pride of Britain Award. In November 2014, Hallenga was featured as a special guest on Russell Howard's Good News where she talked about her charity and experiences. Her memoir, Glittering a Turd, was published in 2021 and it became a Sunday Times bestseller. She lived in Newquay, Cornwall.

Hallenga died at home in Newquay on 4 May 2024, at the age of 38, due to complications from her illness. Her death was announced via her social media accounts on 6 May 2024.

== Illness ==
Hallenga was diagnosed with breast cancer in 2009, at the age of 23. Her doctor originally dismissed a tumour on Hallenga's breast, leading to a late diagnosis. As a result, she lived with stage four breast cancer. Despite Hallenga's cancer having spread to her liver and her bones, and having had a lesion on her brain, she survived her original prognosis by having terminal cancer for over five years. In 2021, Hallenga's condition was stable and her cancer had not been progressing for three years.

I was diagnosed in 2009, and I was diagnosed eight months after first going to the doctors. I was told three times that I was too young to get breast cancer. I decided that my story needs to be told and we need to get young people thinking about breast cancer and their boobs from a younger age, and start checking from a younger age because I never did. I thought it was never going to happen to me.

— Kristin Hallenga, BBC Radio One Newsbeat

== CoppaFeel! ==
Hallenga and her twin sister Maren decided to devote themselves to educating young people about breast cancer. They launched CoppaFeel!, a breast cancer awareness charity, at Beach Break Live in April 2009. The charity received frequent media coverage. In January 2017, Hallenga stepped down as the CEO of CoppaFeel! to move to Cornwall and write a memoir; Natalie Haskell succeeded her as CEO.
