= 2023 Nottingham attacks =

Vehicle-ramming and stabbing attacks in England

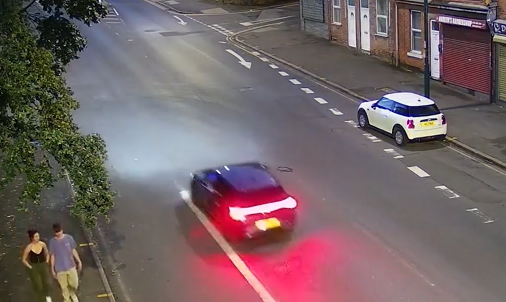
- CCTV footage of Webber and O'Malley-Kumar (lower left), shortly prior to their fatal stabbing
- Location: Nottingham, Nottinghamshire, England
- Date: 13 June 2023; 04:00–05:25 (BST)
- Target: Civilians
- Attack type: Mass stabbing, vehicle-ramming attack
- Weapons: Knives, Vauxhall Vivaro
- Deaths: 3
- Injuries: 5
- Perpetrator: Valdo Calocane
- Motive: Psychotic episode caused by schizophrenia, exacerbated by antipsychotic medication nonadherence

In the early morning of 13 June 2023, three people were fatally stabbed and three others were injured when a van was driven into them in three connected attacks in Nottingham in the East Midlands of the United Kingdom. At around 04:00 BST, Valdo Calocane fatally stabbed two university students in the street and subsequently a school caretaker, whose van he then stole. After driving the van into people at a nearby bus stop, Calocane was arrested. He had prior complained of having repeated instances of psychosis.

On 16 June 2023, Calocane was charged with three counts of murder and three counts of attempted murder and on 17 June he was remanded in custody. In November 2023, Calocane denied the three counts of murder, but admitted three counts of manslaughter, on the basis of diminished responsibility, and three further counts of attempted murder. His pleas were accepted by the prosecution. On 25 January 2024, Calocane was sentenced at Nottingham Crown Court to be detained indefinitely at a high-security hospital.

One of the victims, Grace O'Malley-Kumar, was posthumously awarded the George Medal for her bravery during the incident.

== Attacks ==
Locations of events during the 2023 Nottingham attacks
1 Fatal stabbing of two students (04:00 BST)
2 Attacker attempts to break into hostel (~05:00)
3 Van hijacked; driver fatally stabbed (~05:00)
4 Van strikes pedestrians at a bus stop (05:25)
5 Van drives at pedestrians on Sherwood Street (~05:25)
6 Attacker tasered and arrested outside a shop (05:34)
7 Property linked to attacker raided by police (13:00)

At 04:00 BST on 13 June 2023, two 19-year-olds were found fatally stabbed on Ilkeston Road, Radford, Nottingham. Nottinghamshire Police received a request to attend at 04:05. An anonymous eyewitness told police that he had seen the two students being attacked, heard an awful scream, and saw a man dressed in black with a hood and rucksack fighting with some people. He watched the male victim collapse in the centre of the road, while the woman moved towards a house before disappearing by the side of the house. CCTV footage was later found apparently showing the suspect attempting to break into a bedroom at Seely Hirst House hostel on Mapperley Road, less than an hour after he had attacked the two students.

At 05:25, police were called to an incident in which a van had been driven into people waiting at a bus stop near the Theatre Royal in the city centre, in which three people were injured. The suspect then attempted to run over two other pedestrians in the Sherwood Street area; they were believed to have suffered minor injuries. A man was found stabbed to death on Magdala Road in the Mapperley Park area of the city, close to Seely House Hostel. At about 05:34, after a man approached police with a knife, he was tasered outside a convenience store in Bentinck Road, Forest Fields and was arrested on suspicion of murder.

== Victims ==
The first two people killed in the attacks were 19-year-old first-year students at the University of Nottingham, Barnaby Webber, who was studying history, and Grace O'Malley-Kumar, who was studying medicine. The third person to be killed was 65-year-old Ian Coates, the owner of the van which was subsequently stolen, on his way to work as a school caretaker. The other victims were wounded after they were run into at a bus stop; one was in a critical condition. On 15 June, a Nottingham University Hospitals NHS Trust spokesman said the man left in a critical condition was now stable.

In October 2025, O'Malley-Kumar was posthumously awarded the George Medal, the UK's second highest award for civilian bravery, for her bravery in defending the injured Webber.

== Investigation, arrest and trial ==
Police worked closely with counter-terrorism police but kept an "open mind" as to the motive. Police said they believed that the perpetrator had acted alone. On 16 June 2023 Valdo Calocane was charged with three counts of murder and three counts of attempted murder.

Calocane did not have a criminal record and was not known to the security services, but had a history of mental health issues. On 14 June, detectives applied to Nottingham Magistrates' Court and were granted another 36 hours to question him. On 17 June, Calocane, of no fixed address, made his first appearance in court and was remanded in custody.

In November 2023, Calocane denied three counts of murder but admitted three counts of manslaughter on the basis of diminished responsibility and three further counts of attempted murder. On 23 January 2024 his plea was accepted, and two days later he was sentenced to indefinite detention at a high-security hospital.

== Perpetrator ==
Valdo Amissão Mendes Calocane
- Born: Valdo Amissão Mendes Calocane; 1991 (age 34–35)
- Other name: Adam Mendes
- Citizenship: Bissau-Guinean; Portuguese
- Penalty: Hospital Order with a Restriction Order under sections 37 and 41 of the Mental Health Act 1983

Details
- Country: United Kingdom
- Location: Nottingham
- Killed: 3

The perpetrator was Valdo Amissão Mendes Calocane, (Note: Calocane also goes by the name Adam Mendes.) a dual Guinea-Bissau/Portuguese national who was 31 at the time of the attacks. He has settled status through his Portuguese citizenship.

He moved to the United Kingdom in 2007 with his parents and the family moved to Haverfordwest in Pembrokeshire, Wales, where they were regular worshippers at the Calvary Church there (an independent Pentecostal Church in fellowship with the Assemblies of God). He attended Sir Thomas Picton School and was academically successful. He graduated in mechanical engineering from the University of Nottingham in 2022.

He worked at the Arvato warehouse on 1 May 2023, until 5 May 2023.

== Post-trial events ==
In February 2024, it was announced that judges would review Calocane's sentence after the attorney general labelled it as "unduly lenient." On 26 January, the Attorney General's office announced it would consider a review of the sentence following a referral arguing it was too lenient. Nazir Afzal, a former chief crown prosecutor who was not involved with the case, has said that the decision to accept Calocane's manslaughter pleas and to give him an indefinite hospital Order with a Restriction Order under s37 and 41 of the Mental Health Act 1983 was, as a matter of law, probably the right decision. A hearing at the Court of Appeal into whether the sentence should be changed began on 8 May 2024. They concluded that the sentencing judge had not erred, and the sentence passed was not unduly lenient.

Also on 26 January, NHS England announced an investigation into Calocane's contact with mental health services stretching back to 2020. Leicestershire Police also confirmed that Calocane had been reported for assaulting two colleagues at an Arvato warehouse in Leicestershire, six weeks before the Nottingham stabbings, but that no arrest was made. The force subsequently referred itself to the Independent Office for Police Conduct over its investigation into the assaults.

It was later revealed that Calocane was not sectioned due to his race, because "mental health staff considered research on over-representation of young black men in detention".

== Aftermath ==
On the evening of 13 June 2023, a vigil for the victims was held at St Peter's Church on St Peter's Square in the city centre, led by the Bishop of Southwell and Nottingham, Paul Williams. Hundreds of students attended the vigil, leaving flowers and lighting candles for the victims. At the same time, a memorial quarter peal was rung at All Saints Church near the university, by members of the Nottingham University Society of change ringers. A moment of silence was held before the County Championship cricket match between Essex and Somerset, and the flag was flown at half mast with players wearing black armbands.

On 14 June, thousands of members of the public gathered at the University of Nottingham's University Park Campus at a memorial vigil and were addressed by the fathers of the two student victims. A further, city-wide vigil took place from 17:30 on 15 June, at Old Market Square, with Vice-Chancellor Professor Shearer West, the Lord Mayor Cllr Carole McCulloch and Leader of the Council Cllr David Mellen. To support people who wished to attend, transport on the city's buses were free of charge between 15:00 and 20:00. Close family members of all three of the victims addressed the crowd and a minute's silence was observed at 18:00.

Prime Minister Rishi Sunak, Home Secretary Suella Braverman and Leader of the Opposition Keir Starmer all expressed condolences. The Archbishop of Canterbury responded on Twitter "The terrible and tragic incident in Nottingham this morning. I join with everyone praying for all those affected, for grieving family and friends, and for the emergency services in their ongoing response." The Archbishop of York posted: "Pray for Nottingham today, for those who have died, for the injured, for those who mourn, and for those who care for them. Lord, have mercy."

The Nottingham University Graduation Ball on the evening of 13 June was cancelled by student union officers due to the attacks. Both student victims were members of sports teams, causing many athletes and clubs to respond to the attacks. The Bishop's Hull Cricket Club in Taunton asked for people to leave flowers and respects and the ex-England cricket captain Michael Vaughan paid tribute to one of the deceased. England Hockey, the Southgate Hockey Club, Woodford Wells Cricket Club, and Essex Cricket all offered their condolences for another of the deceased victims. On 16 June, the England and Australia men's cricket teams wore black armbands as a mark of respect and observed a minute's silence, before the national anthems, at the opening day of The Ashes test series at Edgbaston. On 22 June, both countries' women's counterparts followed suit for the opening day of The Women's Ashes series, at Nottingham's Trent Bridge.

On 15 June, Nottinghamshire Police confirmed that they had referred part of the incident to the Independent Office for Police Conduct (IOPC), as a marked police car had followed the van driven by the suspect, before the van collided with two pedestrians.

=== Police WhatsApp message controversy ===
In 2024, Nottinghamshire Police referred itself to the Independent Office for Police Conduct regarding the content of messages in a WhatsApp group discussing the incident and victims using unprofessional and demeaning language. In April, Emma Webber, mother of victim Barnaby Webber wrote an open letter to the officers in the group expressing the disgust caused by the messages.
