= Storm Bert =

2024 windstorm over northwestern Europe

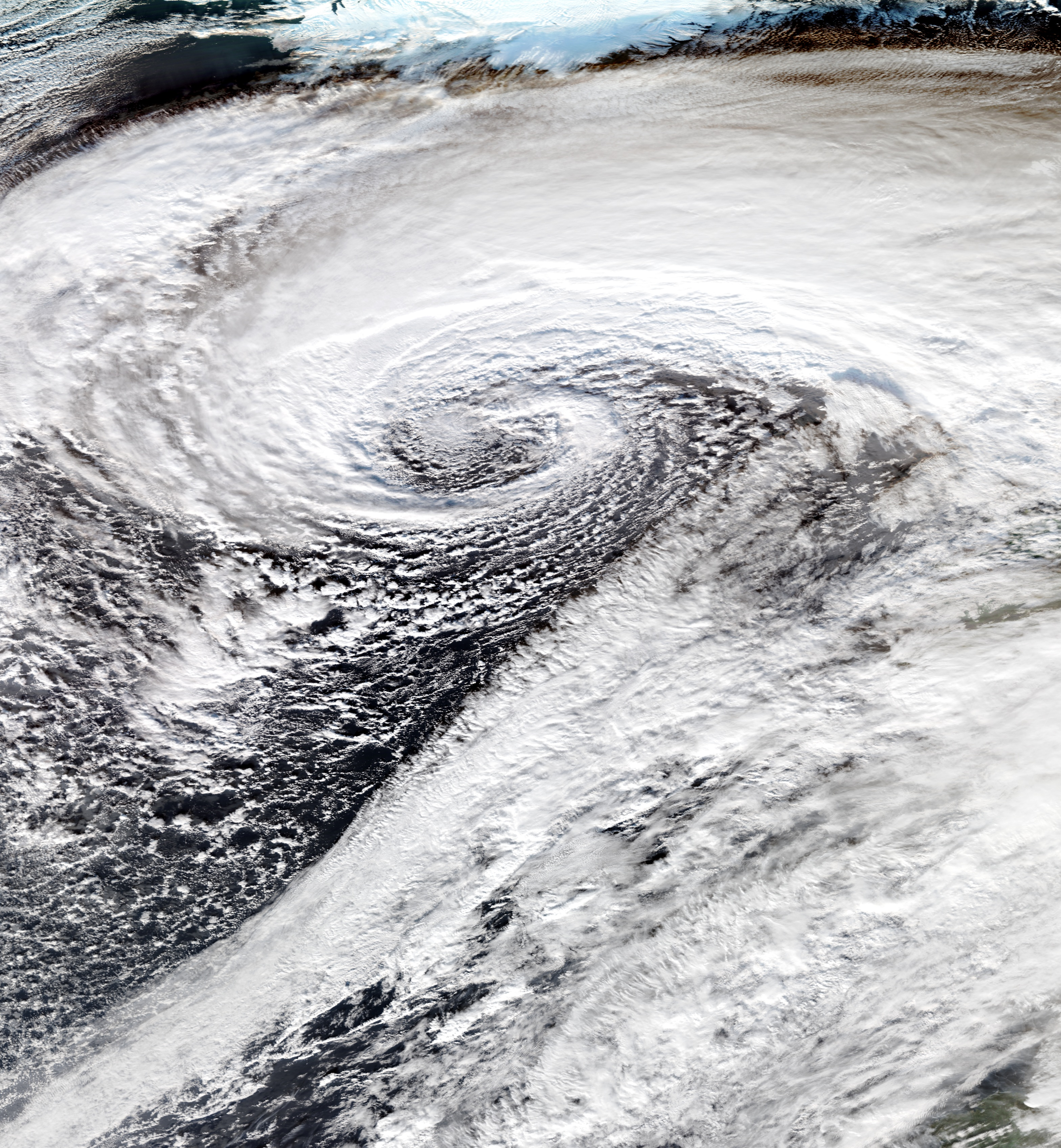
- Storm Bert on 23 November 2024

Meteorological history
- Formed: 21 November 2024
- Dissipated: 26 November 2024

Extratropical cyclone
- Highest gusts: 182 km/h (113 mph; 98 kn) at Cairn Gorm, Scotland
- Lowest pressure: 940 hPa (mbar); 27.76 inHg

Overall effects
- Fatalities: 5
- Areas affected: United Kingdom, Ireland
- Part of the 2024–25 European windstorm season

Storm Bert was a powerful European windstorm that brought severe impacts to the British Isles in late November 2024. It was named by the Met Éireann and Sigrid by Free University of Berlin on 21 November 2024.

== Weather warnings ==
Storm Bert brought heavy snow and ice to parts of the UK, particularly in the north, on Thursday and Friday. As the storm passed, heavy rain affected southern and western regions over the weekend. The Met Office issued severe weather warnings and the UK Health Security Agency has issued cold weather alerts. Drivers were advised to take extra care on the roads due to icy conditions.

An amber snow and ice warning was placed for parts of central Scotland, which included parts of Angus, Perth and Kinross, Stirling, Aberdeenshire, the Highlands, and Argyll and Bute. The warning was originally in place from 07:00–17:00 GMT on 23 November but expired earlier. There was also one for northern England from 06:00–11:59. Several yellow wind and rain warnings were issued for parts of England and Wales. A yellow wind warning was issued for the same areas, excluding Angus, and also included Eileanan Siar and Moray. A yellow warning of rain was also issued which included parts of Angus, Clackmannanshire, Perth and Kinross, Stirling, Aberdeenshire, Moray, Dumfries and Galloway, and the Scottish Borders. The next day a yellow wind warning was issued for the Midlands, East Anglia and the London area.

For Ireland, similar impacts are expected from Storm Bert, with Met Éireann issued yellow wind and rain warnings for the whole country. These are likely to be changed and updated as the system nears.

== Impacts ==
In Ireland, over 34,000 without power. The weather has also brought significant disruption, with several flights disrupted at Newcastle and Dublin airports and extreme flooding in Donegal. Elsewhere, Ferry operator DFDS has cancelled services on some routes until Monday with sailings from Newhaven to Dieppe and Dover to Calais being severely affected.

As a result of the storm there have been five recorded fatalities. A 34-year-old man died after his car "spun off the road" in icy conditions and struck a wall in Shipley, West Yorkshire just before 1 am. Hours later in a separate incident, a second man aged in his 60s was killed when a tree fell onto his vehicle in Hampshire shortly after 7.45 am. In North Wales, the body of a 75-year-old man was recovered from the floods in the Conwy Valley. Five adults and five children have been rescued after a landslide in North Wales. Lancashire Police confirmed a man in his 80s died on Sunday after his car entered a body of water in Colne on Sunday. In Northamptonshire, a man in his forties died in a crash on the A45 near Flore which police have described as an "unexplained death". All 10 people were rescued from the house in Llanarmon Dyffryn Ceiriog, near Llangollen.

In London, at Heathrow Airport, Storm Bert blew crosswinds over 40 knots, forcing pilots to perform more difficult landings such as a sideslip manoeuvre before touchdown. Multiple flights were forced to perform a go-around and fly the missed approach path, there were long delays (including some over 3 hours) and disruption across Heathrow in general.

== Top wind gust ==
Winds from Storm Bert strengthened on Saturday morning, with top gusts of 113 mph (181 km/h) at Cairn Gorm and 82 mph (131 km/h) recorded at Capel Curig in Wales, and 76 mph (122 km/h) at Berry Head, Devon. In Scotland, the Cairngorm mountains saw blizzard conditions and winds of up to 105 mph (169 km/h). Strong winds also forced the closure of the Severn Bridge, which connects Gloucestershire and South Wales.

== See also ==
- Other storms of the same name
