= Murder of Aurman Singh =

2023 murder in Shrewsbury, England

Aurman Singh (9 November 1999 – 21 August 2023) was a 23-year-old delivery driver who was murdered on 21 August 2023 while working in Shrewsbury, England. He was killed in a planned ambush attack. Six men have been convicted of murder, one was convicted of manslaughter, and two suspects remain wanted in connection with the case.

== Murder ==
Aurman Singh, of Smethwick, worked as a delivery driver for DPD and was based at a depot in Stoke-on-Trent. On 21 August 2023, he was delivering parcels on Berwick Avenue in Shrewsbury when he was attacked by a group of men who had travelled to the area in two cars.

The group had obtained details of Aurman Singh’s delivery route from Sukhmandeep Singh, a colleague at DPD. The attackers used multiple weapons, including an axe, a shovel and other implements. Singh sustained fatal injuries and was pronounced dead at the scene.

== Investigation ==
The perpetrators fled in a white Mercedes-Benz and a grey Audi, and some weapons were later recovered after being discarded near the scene. The Mercedes, which Mehakdeep Singh and Sehajpal Singh had fled in, was later found abandoned in Shrewsbury. The pair travelled by taxi to Shrewsbury railway station before continuing by train to Wolverhampton. They then fled to Austria, where they were arrested in Hohenzell in May 2024.

As of 2025, two men remain wanted in connection with the case: Harpreet Singh and Harwinder Singh Turna. In March 2025, the jury was told that Turna had caught a flight to Delhi soon after the attack and remained at large.

== Trials and convictions ==
In April 2024, Arshdeep Singh, Jagdeep Singh, Shivdeep Singh and Manjot Singh were convicted of murder at Stafford Crown Court. Each was sentenced to life imprisonment with a minimum term of 28 years. After the convictions, it was revealed that the four men were in the United Kingdom illegally following the expiration of their visas.

Sukhmandeep Singh was acquitted of murder but convicted of manslaughter for supplying information about the victim’s delivery route and was sentenced to 10 years’ imprisonment.

Following a separate trial in March 2025, Mehakdeep Singh and Sehajpal Singh were also convicted of murder. On 11 April 2025, both were sentenced to life imprisonment with a minimum term of 28 years.

In sentencing remarks, the trial judge described the killing as a planned ambush in which Singh had been unaware the group were waiting for him.

No motive was suggested by prosecutors at the 2024 trial. The Crown Prosecution Service said that their purpose was to prove that the crime had been committed, and not its motive. During the 2025 trial, the prosecution suggested the killing was linked to unrest at a kabaddi tournament in Derby the previous day; Sehajpal Singh testified that he had attended the tournament and that a friend had been hospitalised following violence there.

== Media ==
In June 2025, a three-part documentary, “The DPD Murder”, was broadcast as part of the BBC series Murder 24/7. A fourth part, which covered the continuing investigation and apprehension of the two perpetrators who fled to Austria, aired in July 2026.
