= Sam Farrow =

British female long-distance swimmer

Sam Farrow is a British long-distance swimmer. In September 2024, she claimed a new world record for a British female swimmer after swimming the length of Lake Geneva – a distance of 45.2 miles (78.2km) – in 22 hours and 48 minutes.
