= Pharmacy First =

British medical scheme

In the United Kingdom, and specifically in England, Pharmacy First is an NHS scheme that allows patients to receive medical advice, over-the-counter treatments, and prescription-only medications, directly from a local pharmacist without needing to make an appointment with a GP.

Scotland introduced Pharmacy First in July 2020.

The idea of a scheme to treat common medical ailments using England's pharmacy network, thus relieving pressure on GP services, was originally suggested in October 2021 by Sajid Javid, the Secretary of State for Health and Social Care, as a way of relieving pressure on GP services and after a similar scheme was launched in Scotland. The initiative itself was announced by NHS England and the Department of Health and Social Care in May 2023, when the UK government said that £645m would be invested in the scheme over two years. It was launched on 31 January 2024, with seven ailments included in the scheme at its start were a sore throat, earache, sinusitis, shingles, impetigo, infected bites and urinary tract infections. In May 2026, it was announced that the scheme would be expanded in the autumn to include a further five common ailments, although the nature of these was not disclosed at the time of the announcement.
