= Phil Hoadley =

English footballer (1952–2024)

Personal information
- Full name: Philip Damien Hoadley
- Date of birth: 6 January 1952
- Place of birth: Battersea, London, England
- Date of death: 5 May 2024 (aged 72)
- Height: 5 ft 11 in (1.80 m)
- Position: Central defender

Youth career
- 1967–1968: Crystal Palace

Senior career*
Years	Team	Apps	(Gls)
1968–1972	Crystal Palace	73	(1)
1972–1978	Orient	255	(9)
1978–1982	Norwich City	77	(0)
Total		406	(10)
- * Club domestic league appearances and goals

Philip Damien Hoadley (6 January 1952 – 5 May 2024) was an English footballer who made more than 400 appearances in the Football League playing as a central defender for Crystal Palace, Orient and Norwich City.

== Career ==
Hoadley was born in Battersea, London. He began his career as an apprentice with Crystal Palace. He made his first-team debut on 27 April 1968, as a substitute in the Second Division match away to Bolton Wanderers. At 16 years 112 days, he became Palace's then youngest player. After appearing in 88 matches in all competitions for Crystal Palace, he joined Orient, in September 1971, whom he captained to the semi-finals of the 1977–78 FA Cup. Having played nearly 300 games for Orient, his transfer to Norwich City in 1978 was the first move under freedom of contract legislation with a tribunal setting his value at £110,000. After three years with Norwich he moved to play in Hong Kong football in February 1982, but was forced to retire from professional football following a knee injury. He returned to England and became a publican.

== Later life and death ==
Following his professional football career Hoadley remained involved with amateur football in the Norfolk area and worked in a variety of jobs before returning to Norwich City in the 1990s as football in the community officer. As of 2006, he was landlord of a community-run public house in his local village.

Hoadley died on 5 May 2024, at the age of 72.
