= Vauxhall Vivaro =

Vauxhall Vivaro, a light commercial vehicle also sold as the Opel Vivaro, may refer to:

- The Vauxhall Vivaro 1, based on the second generation Renault Trafic, was produced between 2001 and 2014
- The Vauxhall Vivaro 2, based on the third generation Renault Trafic, was produced between 2014 and 2018
- The Vauxhall Vivaro 3, which is based on the third generation Peugeot Expert, is currently produced from 2019
