= Hampton-on-Sea =

Former village in Kent, England

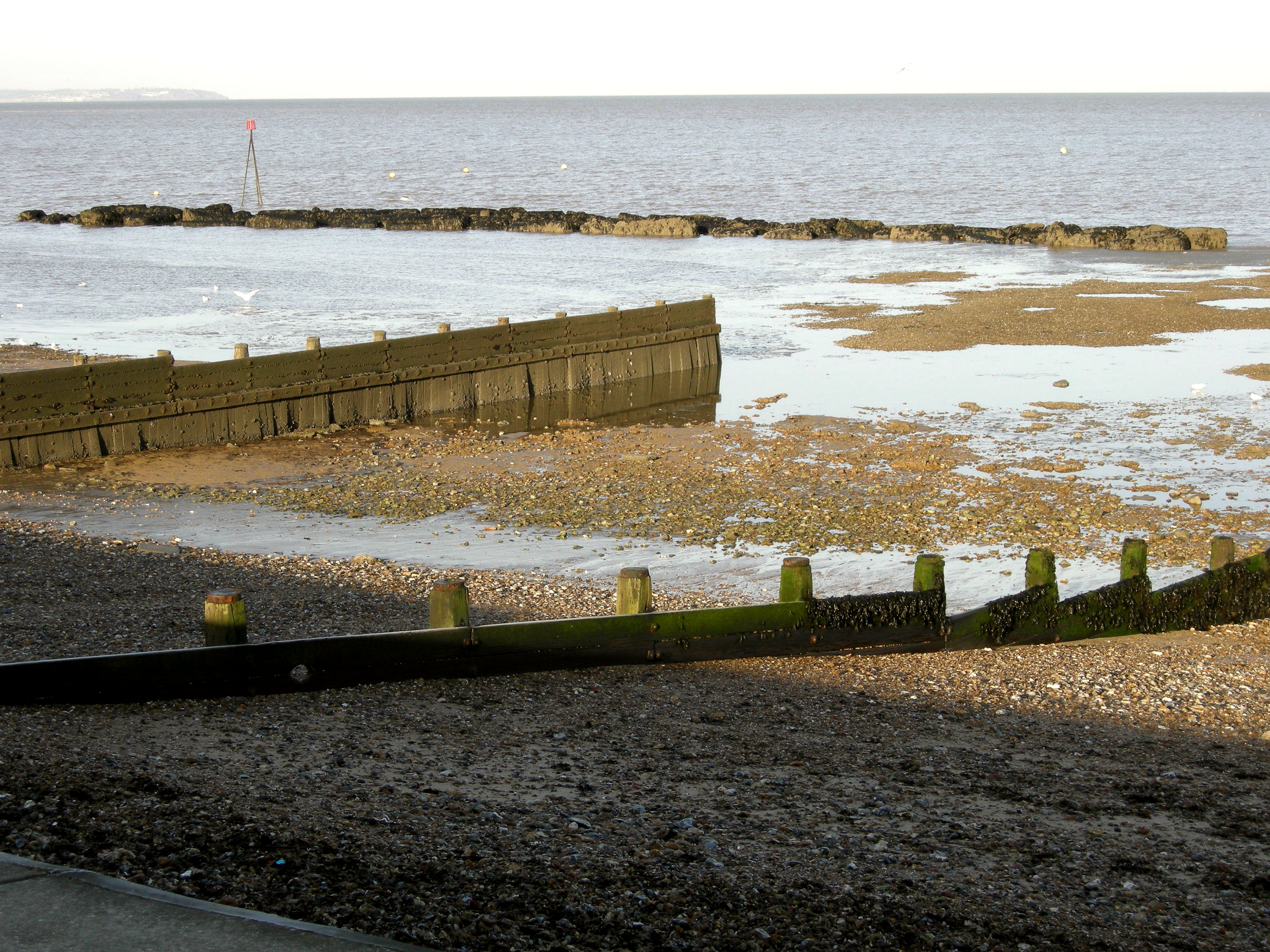
- Where houses once stood
- Interactive map of Hampton-on-Sea
- Location: North coast of Kent, England
- Address: Hampton Pier Avenue, Herne Bay, Kent CT6
- Coordinates: 51°22′14″N 1°05′53″E
- Status: Drowned
- Groundbreaking: 1864 (oyster fisheries); 1879 (Hampton-on-Sea Est Ass); 1888 (Land Co)
- Constructed: 1864–1866 (oyster fisheries); 1879–1880 (Hampton-on-Sea Est Ass); 1888–1899 (Land Co and plotholders)
- Destroyed: 1916 (abandoned); 1921 (demolished and drowned); 1934 (Hampton farmhouse lost)

Companies
- Developer: T.K. Freeman (Hampton-on-Sea Est Ass); F.F. Ramuz (Land Co)

Technical details
- Cost: Hampton Pier £28,000; Plots £3–32
- Buildings: 9 houses (oyster fisheries); 8 houses (Land Co)
- No. of tenants: 17 (Land Co and plotholders)

Hampton-on-Sea is a drowned and abandoned village in what is now the Hampton area of Herne Bay, Kent. It grew from a tiny fishing hamlet in 1864 at the hands of an oyster fishery company, was developed from 1879 by land agents, abandoned in 1916 and finally drowned due to coastal erosion by 1921. All that now remains is the stub of the original pier, the Hampton Inn, and the rocky arc of Hampton-on-Sea's ruined coastal defence visible at low tide. The site is notable for sharing its history with the eccentric Edmund Reid. Reid was previously the Metropolitan Police head of CID who handled the Jack the Ripper case. In retirement he chose to champion the plight of the beleaguered residents of the settlement.

== Location ==
Today Hampton, Herne Bay is the coastal west end of Herne Bay, Kent. The site of Hampton-on-Sea is now underwater due to coastal erosion, but it was on the west side of the northern end of Hampton Pier Avenue, between the 1959 sea defences and the remains of the sea wall which are exposed at low water in Hampton bay. When Hampton-on-Sea existed and until 1934, the Hampton-on-Sea site was under the jurisdiction of Blean Rural District Council, the boundary with Herne Bay Council running north–south along the line of the present-day Hampton Pier Avenue. In 1934, the area was transferred to Herne Bay Urban District Council, and in 1974 to Canterbury City Council.

== History ==
=== Background ===
On the sea-bed, offshore of this site, are remains of prehistoric and Roman activity. Hampton means "home farm", and before the development there were two farmhouses, a beerhouse, a few cottages containing the Mount and Quick fishing families, and the West Brook which was also known as Hampton Brook. The settlement had a reputation for a wild life, and Hill Farmhouse was said to have cellars or caves underneath for smuggling. Some cottages were built of old boats and wreckage; Hampton Farmhouse was then 300 yards from the sea and dated back to the 17th century. A low sea cliff made of soil edged the coast west of Hampton Pier, and coastal erosion was already an acknowledged problem for the farmers by 1836. Altogether the coastline at this site receded by 175 metres (574 ft) in the years between the completion of Hampton Pier in 1865, and the start of construction of modern coastal defences in 1958. Sea floodings have been officially recorded on this coastline since the great storm of 1897.

=== Oyster fisheries ===
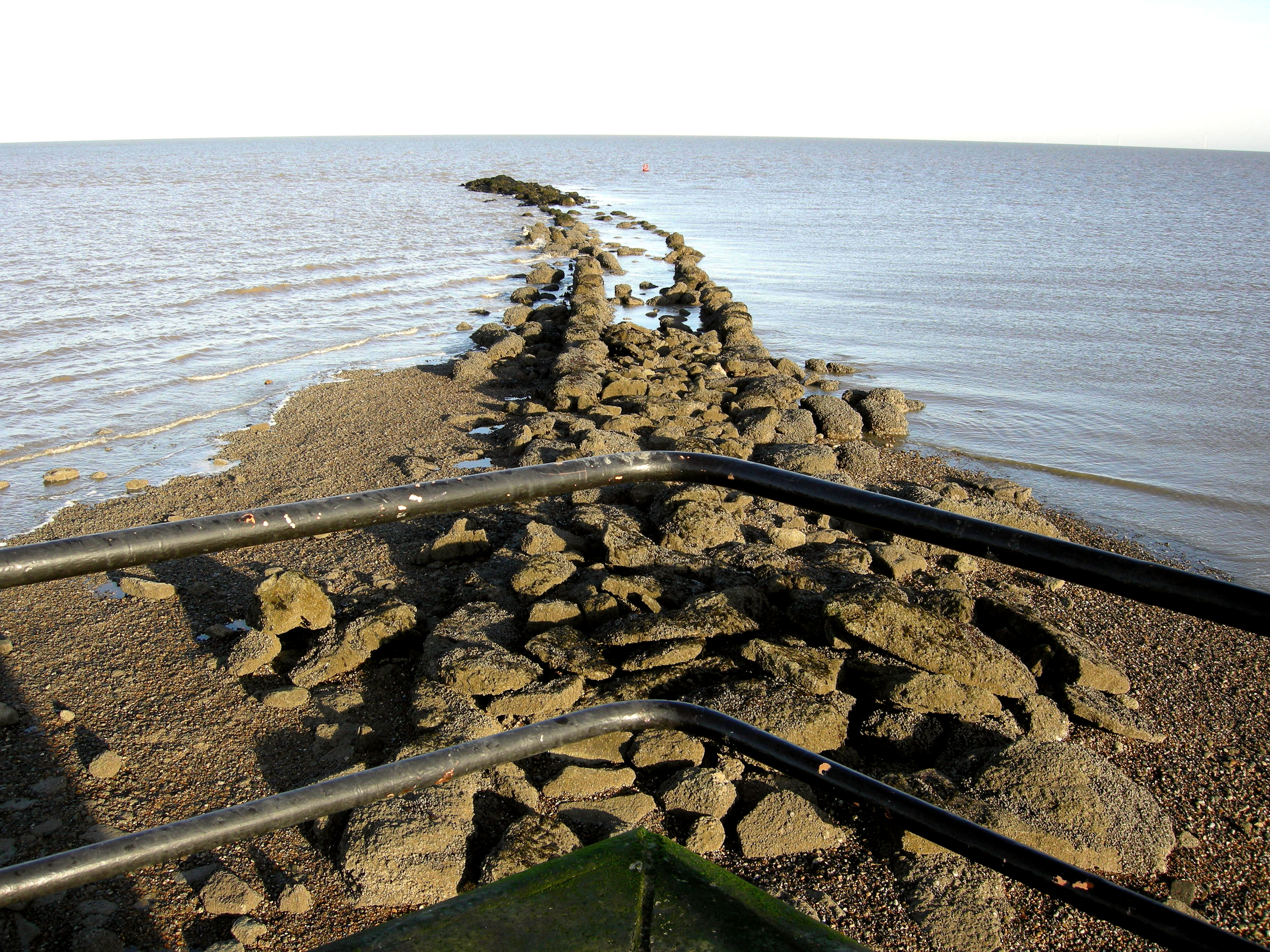
Remains of Hampton Pier built by oyster fisheries, 1865

Oysters had thriven in the Thames Estuary since the Romans promoted them; they were sold in city streets and eaten raw.

1860–1864 had been a boom year for oyster farming, especially in nearby Whitstable, and the government supported the trade by passing the Herne Bay Fishery Act 1864 (27 & 28 Vict. c. cclxxx) to promote cultivation. The act, passed on 25 July 1864, incorporated the Herne Bay, Hampton and Reculver Oyster Fishery Company with authorisation to raise £10,000 capital in £10 shares. Frank Buckland was the inaugural chairman, and Cholmondeley Pennell was deputy chairman. The company's proposals included five oyster smacks or yawls, a pier with storehouses, housing for workers and five freshwater breeding ponds. The act was passed in spite of objections from local business competition, allowed the new company to compulsorily acquire land at Hampton, and gave the company sole rights to dredge for oysters for seven miles (11 km) from Swalecliffe to Reculver and up to three miles (4.8 km) – but mainly one and a half miles – from shore. The total area under its jurisdiction was nine square miles, of which a third was foreshore, and it employed thirty-three regular men; sometimes up to a hundred. In 1865 and 1866 their chairman Cholmondeley Pennell applied unsuccessfully for extensions to these rights. Before selling the oysters dredged from the estuary, the company obtained brood oysters from Essex, France, the Netherlands and Portugal. The smacks took the oysters twice a week on Tuesdays and Fridays to Billingsgate.

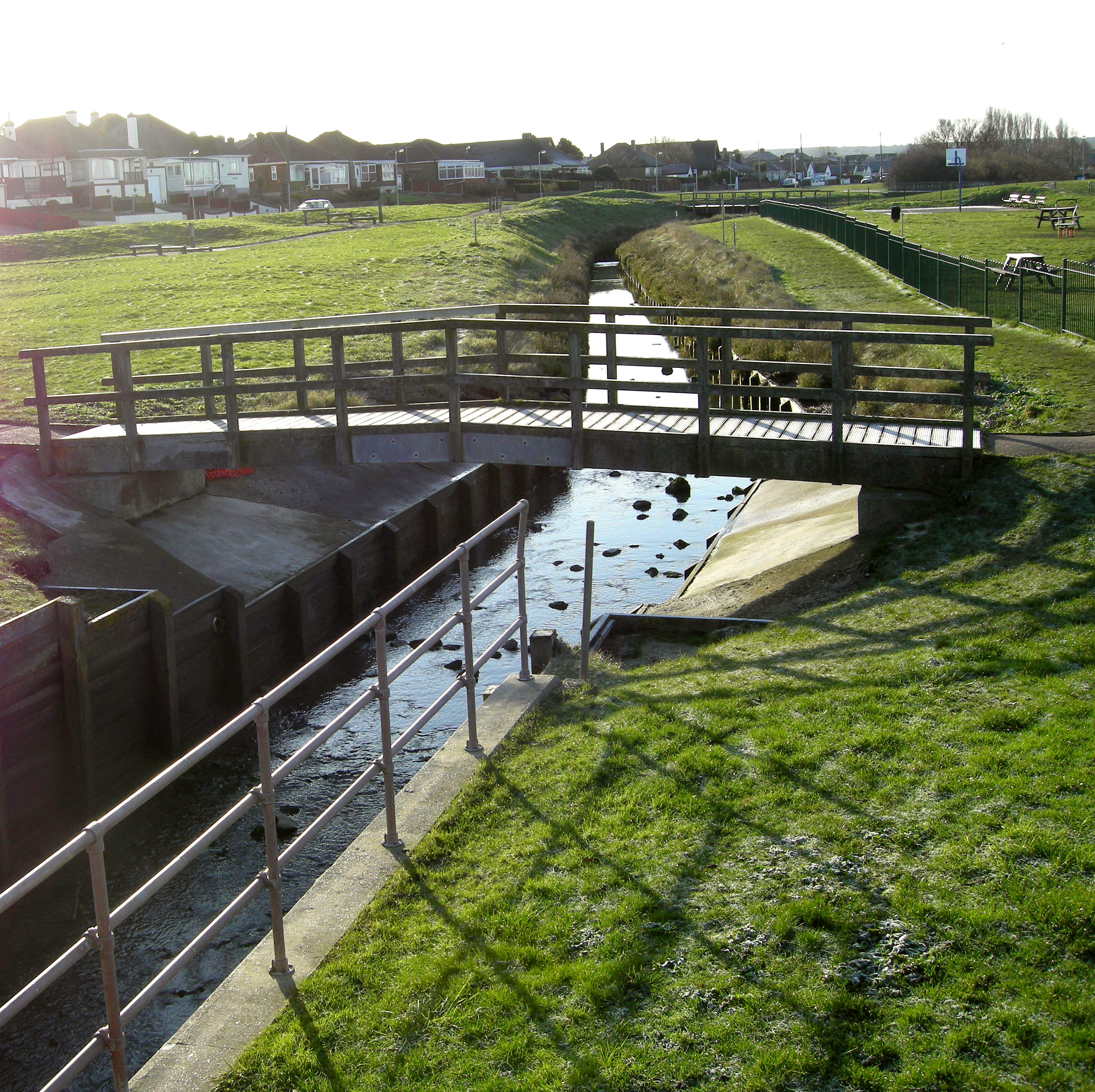
Hampton Brook; fishpools were on right

The company was successful at first, although stressed by underfunding and the cost of the pier, and by 1866 an enquiry commission stated:

"The Company have already cleared about five square miles, and culched about one square mile of their grounds, and have laid down on parts of their beds many millions of oysters".

However, as the company was still relatively new, they had not yet developed their oysters to quite the same market value as the long-established Whitstable ones. A sideline for the Hampton fishermen was cement stones, because they were found on the Hampton fishing grounds. These were boulders the size of a man's head, sold to manufacturers of Roman cement. There was a dispute with the rival Whitstable Oyster Company, and Whitstable was fined £1 per oyster taken from Hampton's grounds, while Hampton was accused of not fully exploiting its breeding ponds and of importing foreign oysters for resale. In 1869, local inshore fishermen complained that their traditional territory was now defended on the company's behalf by HMS Buzzard and that the company employed outsiders for long hours and low pay. In the 1870s the oyster trade went into decline and suffered over-fishing, and in 1876 the Government set up a select committee to enquire into scarcity and price. The result was the Fisheries (Oyster, Crab, and Lobster) Act 1877 (40 & 41 Vict. c. 42), which prevented sale of dredged oysters in June to August, and freshwater pond oysters between May and August. In the following three severe winters, oysters died in the shallow estuary waters and the company went into liquidation. The business passed into the hands of hotel owner Major Davis who closed it down when his operation went to Faversham. Company assets were sold on 20 July 1881 and it officially wound up in 1884.

=== Tramway ===
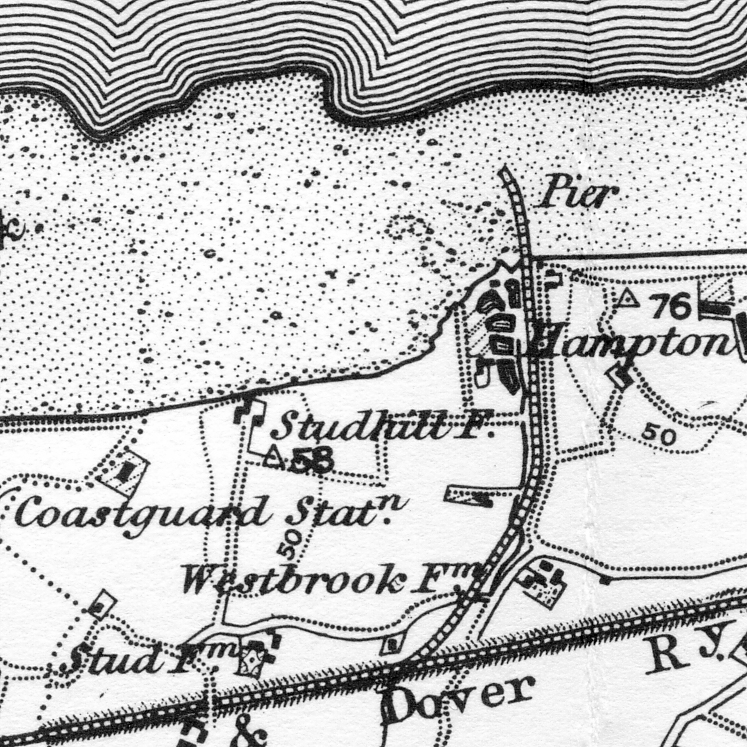
1878 map showing tramline

The tramway began and ended with the oyster fishery from 1864 to 1884. So that cargo could begin its journey to Kent and London on a horse-tram, the tramway was built due south from the pier to the railway which had been built in 1861. This track, which was later to become Hampton Pier Avenue, was straightened at its northern end and raised above risk of flood for the tram. By 1866 the tracks were still not laid along the pier itself, but according to the OS map of 1878, it had been completed by then. At the southern end, the tramway curved westward, running beside Westbrook, and reached the railway line just east of the point where Westbrook crosses it, and to the west of where Hampton Close is today: see 1878 map, pictured. One Judah Downs won £900 in a dispute over land crossed by the tramway, and the company later bought him out as well. After the company went into liquidation, the tramway was removed in the 1880s. For much of the 20th century it was possible to see where the tramway reached the railway line.

=== Resort ===
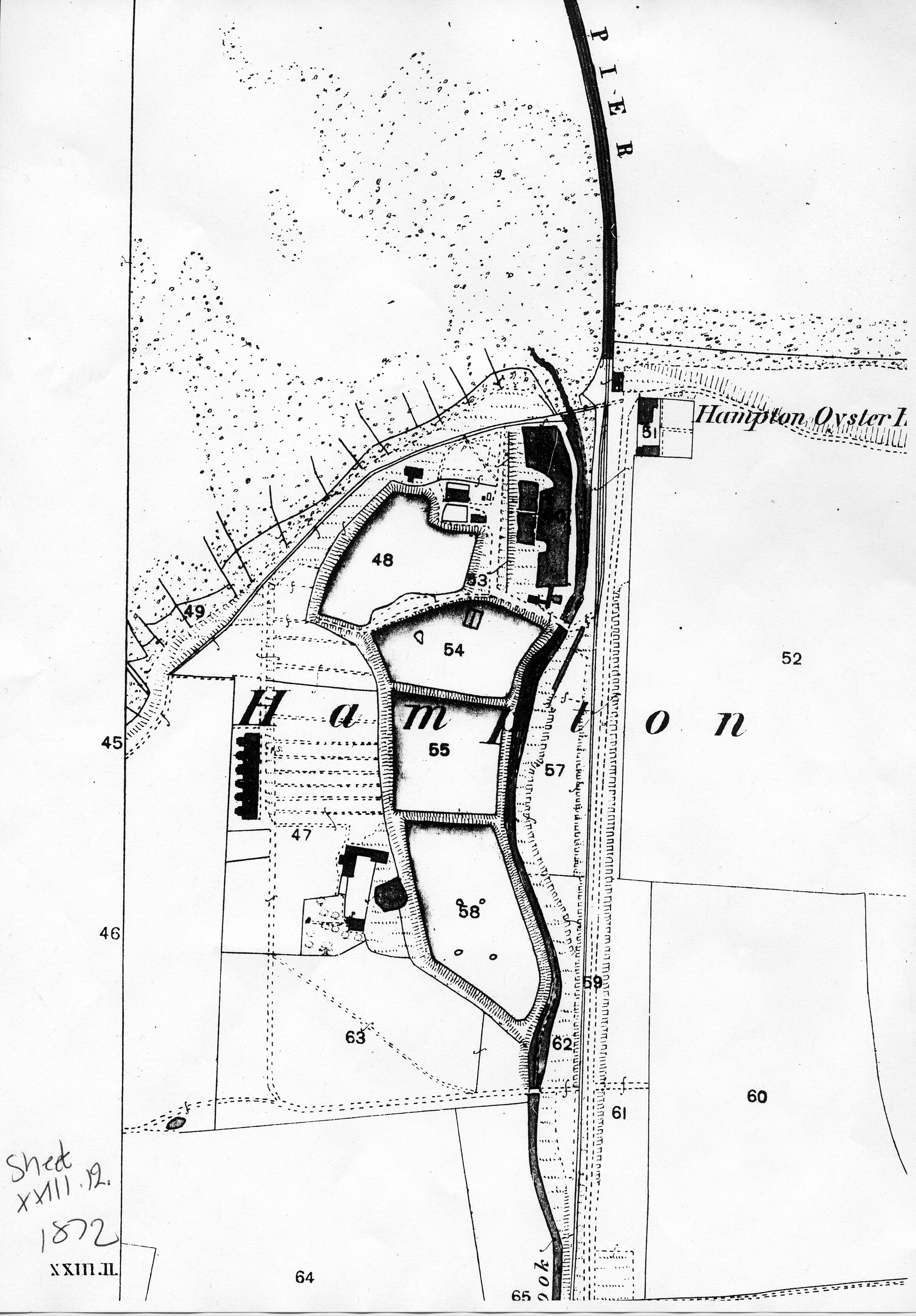
1872 coastline with old pier and oyster fishery

Thomas Kyffin Freeman, owner of the Herne Bay Argus, formed the Hampton-on-Sea Estate Association Limited in 1879 with £60,000 capital in £10 shares, but only sold 398 shares. He built a bandstand, built foundations for reading rooms and planned tennis courts, a miniature golf course, an archery green and a recreation ground. He organised a sports day with free teas and amusement rides, but too many visitors arrived and he ran out of teas. With builder Thomas Richard Geelong Hoe he planned a housing estate, and a Hampton-on-Sea nameboard was put up at Herne Bay railway station in expectation of this, but then he died in 1880. The company was eventually dissolved in 1905.

Frederick Francis Ramuz, Mayor of Southend and land agent, bought the property cheaply. The Hampton Pier Inn (today the Hampton Inn) became the Land Company's base for its administration of the 750 acres (3.0 km^{2}) of land it had bought altogether in Herne Bay. Planned street names which no longer exist were Swalecliffe Gardens, Hampton Grand Parade, Marine Drive, Canterbury Gardens, Hampton Gardens, Eddington Gardens next to Hampton Farmhouse and Herncliffe Gardens incorporating the oyster fishery's Hampton Terrace. The company proposed a genteel resort with large brick bungalows and villas, a temperance hotel plus church, and shops plus tavern. Freeman's idea for a recreation ground was resurrected for good measure.

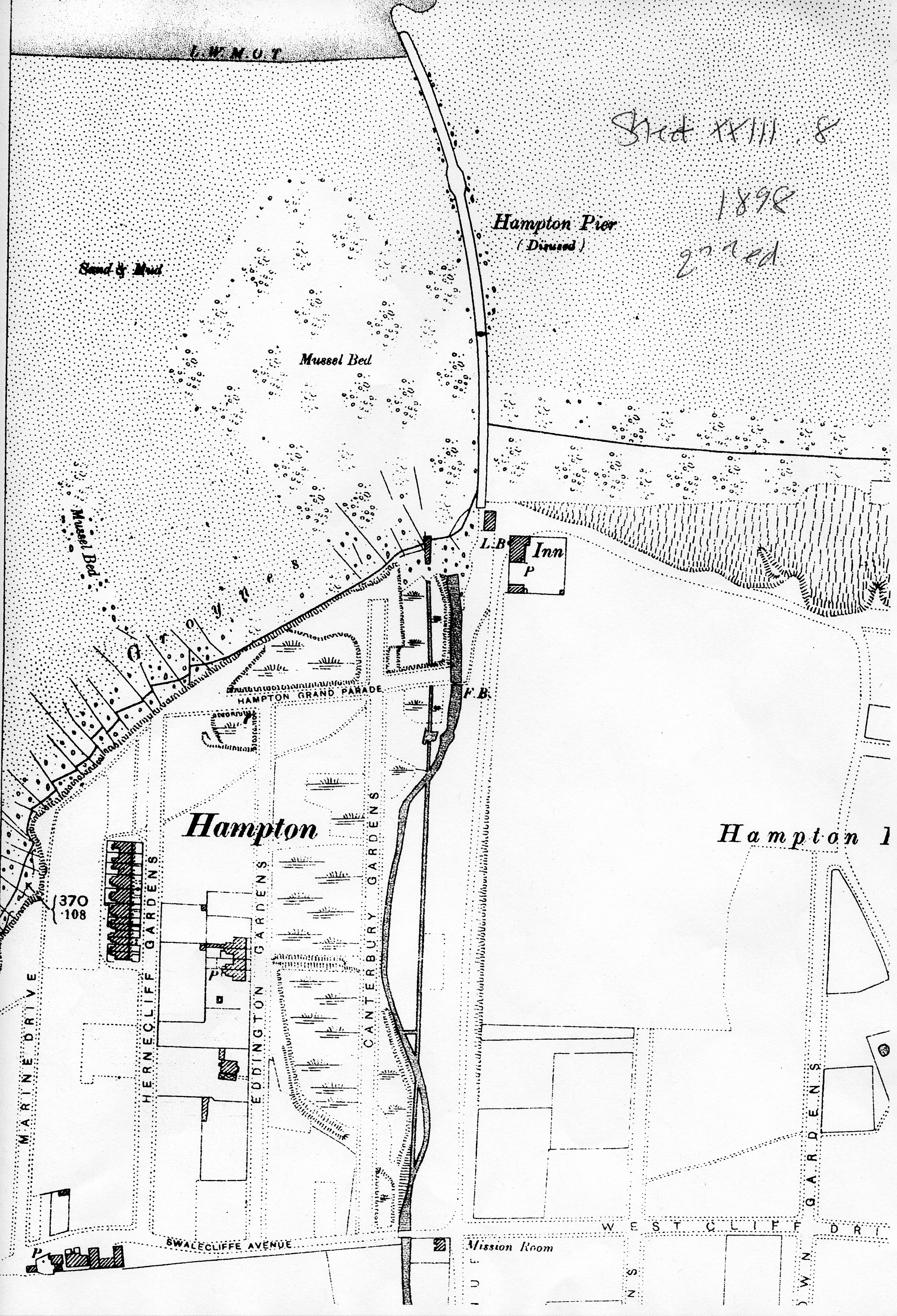
1898 coastline with Land Company's development. Cf 1872, 1878 and 1978 maps: western coastline moves north as beach accumulates; eastern coastline erodes south by 2 m (2.2 yd) per year

Ramuz divided the "Grand Parade Estate at Hampton-on-Sea" into 124 development plots for the first auction on 17 September 1888 "to suit all classes" and set up a sales marquee onsite. Cheap, refundable train fares and a free lunch were promised to prospective purchasers. All the plots were sold within one and a half hours after the buyers, mostly from London, were serenaded by the Buffs 3rd Battalion band during their free lunch. Plots facing the sea made £18, and those at the back £8 to £9, with the old farmhouse making £100 and the tavern plot £39: all moneys were payable in instalments. The Land Company made £2,000.

By the date of the second marquee-auction of 126 more plots, the Land Company had built roads and was repairing the pier. Plots were advertised more energetically than before and promoted on the basis of Herne Bay's smallness, cheapness, ripeness for speculation and its proximity to the railway line. Sales were aimed at landlords wanting to buy cheaply and rent at profit, because at that time house-ownership was uncommon and tenancy was the norm. Prospective purchasers were promised trams and buses to take tenants to the railway station, or even an extra railway station close to the estate. The empty and rural nature of this spot was translated into promises of botanising, shooting, bathing, sailing and angling. Although no cheap train was provided on this occasion, plots sold at £8 to £32, making the Land Company £1,370. During 1889 sales were promoted by newspaper advertisements rather than auctions, and the pier's repairs were said to be ongoing. According to these advertisements there were croquet lawns and tennis courts plus a spring.

A third sale of 144 plots took place on 7 July 1890 making £2,450 for the Land Company, and events included a regatta with a coastguards' race and pair-oared rowing race, plus a traditional duck hunt in which a man acts as duck. The fourth and final auction of 124 plots on 28 July 1890 promised yet another special train from London and the opportunity to buy the shop plots and more villa plots. Four shop plots went for £54, villa plots for £3 to £7, and we are not told the sum earned by the company. Some plots remained unsold, and these were advertised throughout 1891. Following the four auctions and three years of advertising, very few plots were developed, and the temperance hotel, church, shops and tavern were never built.

=== Causes of erosion and flooding ===
==== Hampton pier ====
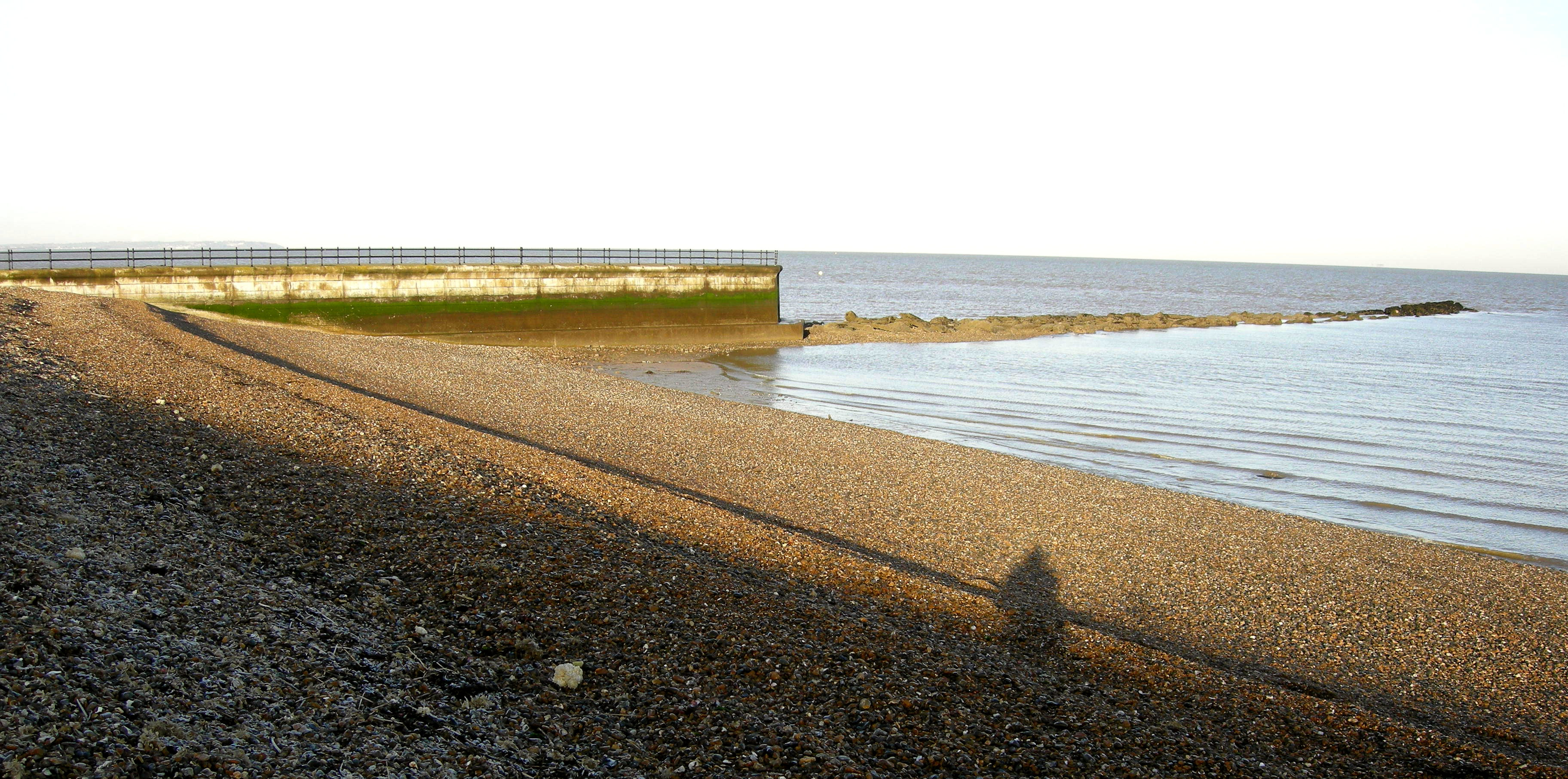
Hampton Pier, 2010

Hampton pier was built of wood and concrete by the oyster company in 1865 at cost of £28,000; it was 1,050 feet (320 m) long so that the landing stage was in deep enough water to allow for the two-fathom draught of the smacks. It curved slightly westwards to allow the company's oyster smacks and European oyster trading boats to berth on the lee side in a north-easterly wind. Its purpose was threefold: a landing stage for oysters and materials, a shelter for the oyster smacks and a breakwater for fishing grounds. The Lord Mayor of London Thomas Gabriel arrived in a special train to open it on 15 September 1866. After the collapse of the oyster fishery, the pier was said to be under repair by land agent Frederick Francis Ramuz in October 1888. Thereafter, the pier became derelict. In the great storm of 28–29 November 1897 it was badly damaged, and then partially demolished in 1898 to halt erosion and save the houses of Hampton-on-Sea. In 1901, the Council bought it and at a cost of £2,000 the Surveyor to the Council F. W. J. Palmer rebuilt the stub in 1903–1904 as it is today, at 350 feet (110 m) long. The remaining piles and ruins of the old pier were a shipping hazard and had to be buoyed with large warning notices.

==== Tidal causes ====
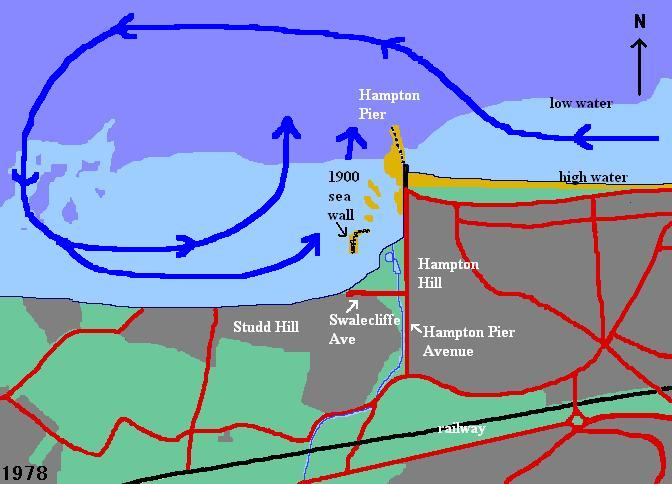
Possible eddy during 9–10 knot tide race at Hampton, based on 1978 map

The cause of the erosion and flooding which eventually drowned this development was the original Hampton Pier. The ebb and flow of tidal streams is powerful in the shallow Thames Estuary, where its tidal waters are caught in the vortex of the tidal push from Atlantic waters via both the north and south of the British Isles. Off Herne Bay, the running ebb current moves at 10.15 knots, and the flow at 9.14 knots (16.93 km/h). Where strong currents meet and divide, or are disrupted by uneven coastal features, there are eddies. After Hampton Pier was first built, the flow running west along Herne Bay beach dropped its sand and pebbles on the east side of the pier instead of replenishing beach material in front of the new development. Subsequently, after being forced into a loop around the pier-end it was possibly forced into a shoreward eddy by deep-water currents. That means that at a certain point in the flow-tide it could have continued briefly westward past Hampton-on-Sea, then turned inshore and looped back strongly eastwards along the beach towards Hampton Pier Avenue, eroding land at Hampton-on-Sea and then turning north along Hampton Pier Avenue and the pier, carrying soil with it. It is said that the later shortening of the pier was not enough and that erosion will continue, so such an eddy may explain the need for today's shore defences along the north end of Hampton Pier Avenue. An additional possibility is related to the strong ebb flow's history of removing the headlands of Herne Bay's original bay before the 19th century. This current moving east, being baulked and turned north suddenly by the new sea defences of Hampton Pier Avenue and Hampton Pier, might easily erode the little Hampton-on-Sea bay in default of the Hampton Pier headland. Both the above theories allow for scoured coastal material to be removed to deeper waters to the north of Hampton-on-Sea by the ebb tide and by the occasional eddy, besides being dropped at Long Rock by an alternate normal east–west flow tide. When there are exceptional conditions on top of these tidal streams, for example a low pressure system causing higher water level coinciding with strong north-westerly winds, coastal flooding can occur.

==== Causes on land ====
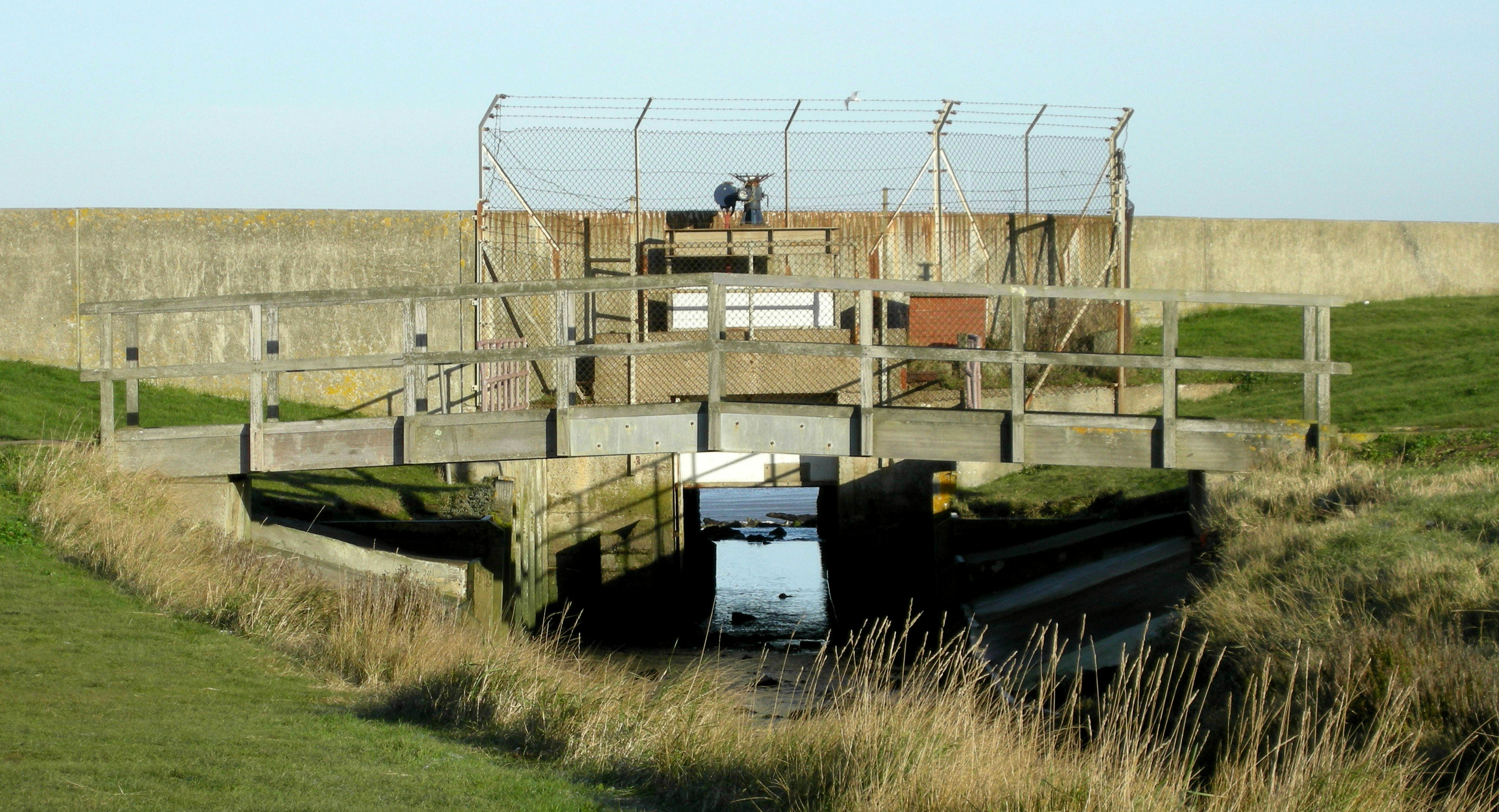
Westbrook culvert, 2010

Hampton Brook, now Westbrook, reached the sea through a stone culvert but seaweed often blocked it, making it overflow and become stagnant. The land between the houses and the often-foetid Hampton Brook was low-lying enough to be subject to flood during a combination of spring tide, prolonged rainfall and onshore wind. Either the digging or the filling-in of the oyster company's fishpools created soft, unstable land.

=== Buildings, sea wall and flooding ===
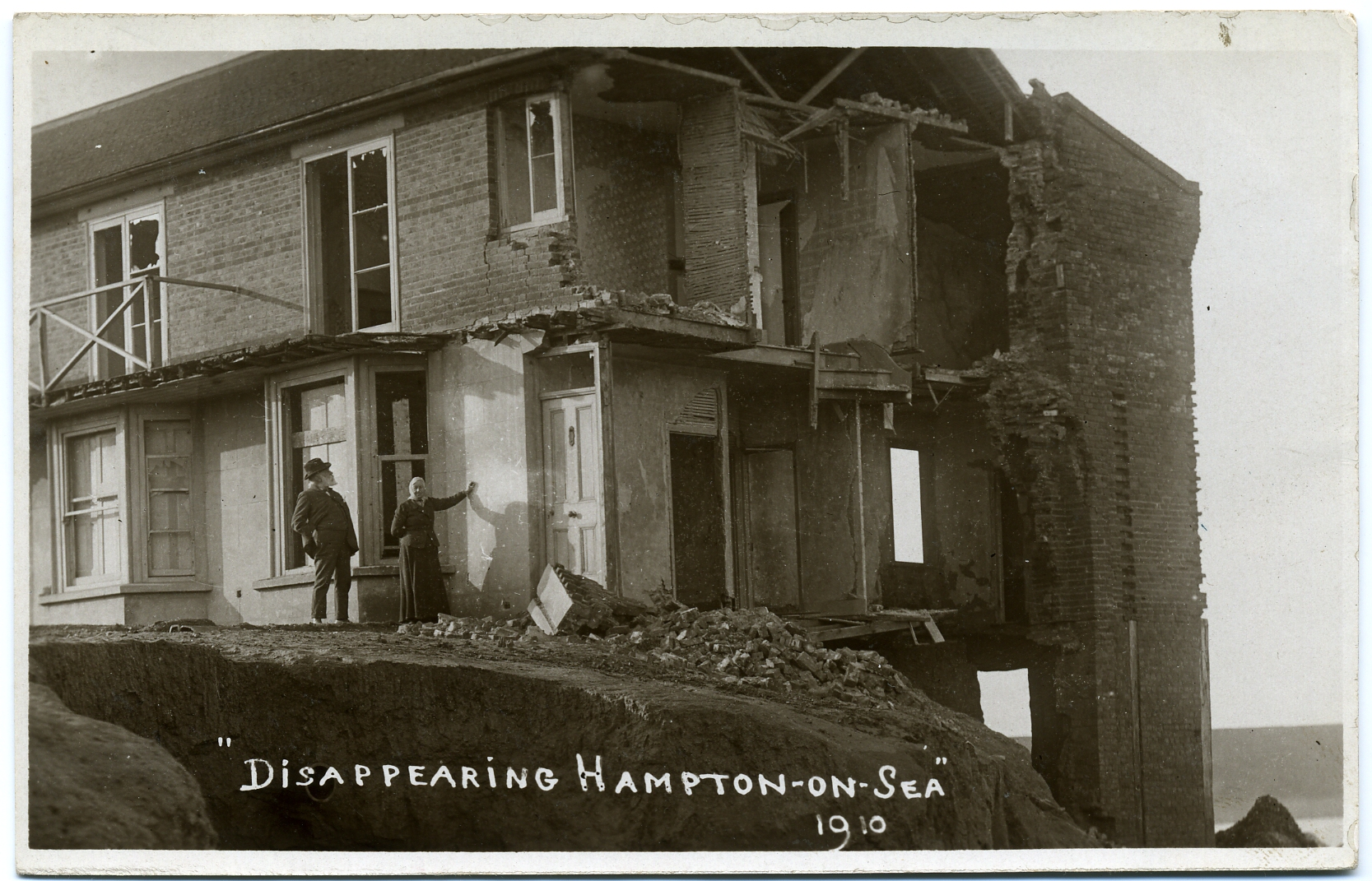
Edmund Reid and neighbour examine the most northerly house of Herncliffe Gardens as it falls into the sea, by Fred C. Palmer, early 1910

Hampton Terrace was built for the oyster company's workers in 1866, and it later became part of Herncliffe Gardens which no longer exists. The Hampton Oyster Inn, today the Hampton Inn, was built by a brewer opposite the pier entrance. Only eight plots bought from the Land Company were developed: Hampton Terrace in Herncliffe Gardens was extended by three villas; four villas were built in Eddington Gardens alongside the old Hampton Farmhouse; lastly Pleasant Cottage, later called Hampton Bungalow, was built in Swalecliffe Avenue in the late 1890s. Of the roads and plots created by the Land Company, only Swalecliffe Avenue and Hampton Pier Avenue survive today. Wave damage in the great storm of 28–29 November 1897 damaged the three Herncliffe Garden houses, and brought coastal erosion closer to the properties. In 1899, a wall of faggots and four 250-foot (76 m) groynes were ineffectual against the onset of the sea. John Davis and W.H. Banks abandoned numbers One and Two Herncliffe Gardens in July 1899, while numbers Three to Twelve remained tenanted until at least 1902, and in 1899–1900 a sea wall was built to protect the houses. By 1901 number Three had been abandoned, though officially listed as occupied, and the high-water mark had reached the corner of number One. By 1905 Hampton Grand Parade and half of Marine Drive had been eroded away; then a storm broke through the sea wall and scoured out the land from behind it. In spite of having had to buy back land from worried investors, the Land Company continued to advertise empty houses in Herncliffe Gardens for sale. By 1910 the two seaward-end houses had been demolished, and by the end of 1911 all twelve houses of Herncliffe Gardens terrace were abandoned and then demolished with the sea at the back doors. In 1916, Eddington Gardens was abandoned by its last resident, Edmund Reid. By the 1920s only Hampton Farmhouse and numbers One and Two Eddington Gardens were left of Hampton-on-Sea, and the latter two were demolished in 1921. It is at that point that Hampton-on-Sea is said to have been finally drowned. In 1934, the old farmhouse was the last to go.

=== Edmund Reid ===
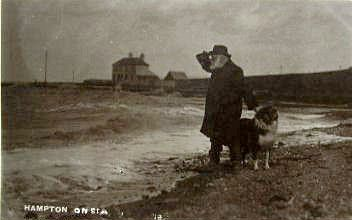
Edmund Reid at Hampton-on-Sea, by Fred C. Palmer, 1912

In 1903, Edmund James Reid (1846; – Herne Bay 5 December 1917) moved into number Four, Eddington Gardens: the house at the landward end of the terrace, previously advertised for £300. At that point the sea was still about two hundred yards away. He had retired in 1896, having been head of CID in the Metropolitan police, and his most famous case was the Whitechapel murders in 1888. He named his house Reid's Ranch, painted castellations and cannon on its side and soon became known as the eccentric champion of the beleaguered Hampton-on-Sea residents. His house contained a parrot and many photographs of his London cases. His garden contained a cannonball found on his property, a post from the end of the old pier and a flagpole with a union flag. From a wooden kiosk in his garden named the Hampton-on-Sea Hotel he sold soft drinks and postcards featuring himself and the fast-vanishing remains of Hampton-on-Sea.

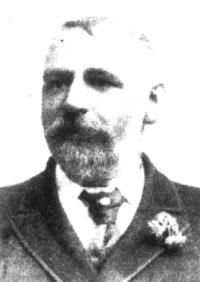
Edmund Reid before 1898

Some of these were photographed by Fred C. Palmer of Herne Bay, who was the Herne Bay Press photographer for all big events. The stagnant Hampton Brook became a butt of Reid's jokes and he renamed it Lavender Brook, sending sardonic letters to the Council about erosion, Hampton Brook, public facilities and the pier as shipping hazard. With two neighbours he built a bridge over the brook, but it was declared dangerous and demolished by the council. The sea flowed closer to his property, and in 1915 he was the last remaining resident of Eddington Gardens and of Hampton-on-Sea. He abandoned his house in 1916, moved to Herne Bay, married in 1917 and died aged 71 on 5 December of the same year. He was buried in Herne Bay Cemetery in plot S62 on 8 December 1917.

=== Aftermath ===
By the 1920s and 30s on the higher land of Hampton, the first houses on Hampton Pier Avenue and Swalecliffe Avenue were being built; this time as a suburb of Herne Bay. Houses eventually filled Hampton Hill to the east of Hampton Pier Avenue, and Studd Hill to the south of the Hampton-on-Sea site. From 1929 to 1966 there was a boating lake in place of the landward oyster pond; it is now a playground. Besides the stub of Hampton Pier and the Hampton Inn, the curved shape of the Land Company's 1900 sea wall, visible at low tide, is all that is left of Hampton-on-Sea. From the 1990s to 2005 this object, known as The Rocks, was considered a shipping hazard, mainly with respect to the jetskiers who ignored and vandalised safety notices about jetskiing near The Rocks. Some chunks of it were removed by contractors until local objections prevented further loss of this landmark which now shelters rockpools, mussels and feeding birds. The coast was conserved in 1959 to 1960 with a new sea defence, and in the same years the landscaping that followed a cliff drainage scheme running down from the Studd Hill estate replaced sea poppies and summer crickets with lawn.

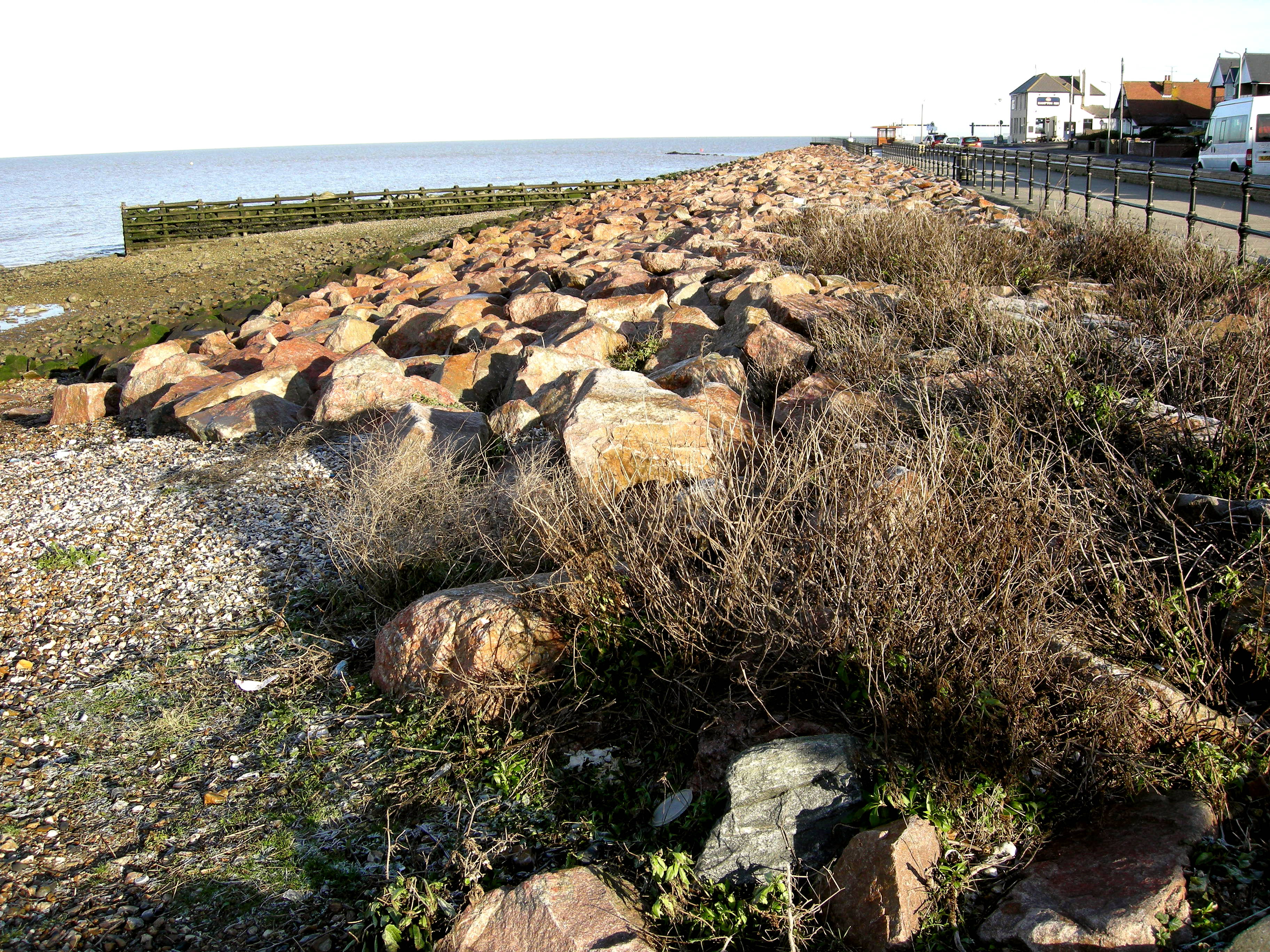
Hampton Pier Avenue rock armour revetment, 2010

Where Herncliffe Gardens and Eddington Gardens stood, there is now the 1959 sea wall, beach and undersea mud. Knowledge of what had existed there persisted mostly in the mythology of local children, until in the 1990s an information board featuring a picture of Reid was erected beside the Pier. A Council Oyster Bay Trail cycle route, planned in 2009, is named after the area's history. Today there is an established walking route along the 1959 coastal defence; it is part of the Saxon Shore Way. The committee for Herne Bay Festival 2008 agreed a cross-marketing strategy with Whitstable Oyster Festival, thus recognising the history of dredging off Herne Bay by the oyster fisheries working from Hampton-on-Sea in the 19th century. There is still a very small fleet of day fishing boats operating offshore of the Hampton area, and landing on the beach at Herne Bay.

Coastal erosion at Hampton-on-Sea has been estimated at 2 m (2.2 yd) per annum between the construction of the old Hampton Pier in 1865 to 1959 when the Council built the sea wall. The direction and rate of influential currents is unknown, but it is calculated that 180 m^{3} (240 cu yd) of coastal sediment per annum is scoured by the sea from the Hampton-on-Sea coast and deposited 2 km (1.2 mi) to the west at Long Rock, Swalecliffe. This area with a defensive frontage of 220 m (240 yd) is now known as the Hampton Flood Basin and Hampton Brook, now officially Westbrook, is still prone to floodlocking, as occurred in 2001. Although the 1959 sea wall and groynes were updated in 1983, and Hampton Pier Avenue's rock armour revetment was upgraded in 1994, it is thought that eventually the sea defences would need to be raised. Nevertheless, although sea-damage was done by the great 1953 and 1978 storms, the upgraded defences protected this coast from the severe 1996 storm. Costs of increasing flood defences here are estimated at £1–7 million, especially as the work has to be modified because this area is a SSSI and SPA. Cost and limitations meant that a short-term solution of £635,000 capital works was recommended by the Council Steering Group on 29 June 2009 to be implemented from winter 2011 to spring 2011. The recommendation was to hold the line with replacement and improvement of six timber groynes, importing a new beach of 12,000 m^{3} (15,700 cu yd) partly taken from Long Rock, raising and extending the rear wall and closing off openings with floodgates. Beach replenishment and groyne replanking would continue at intervals.

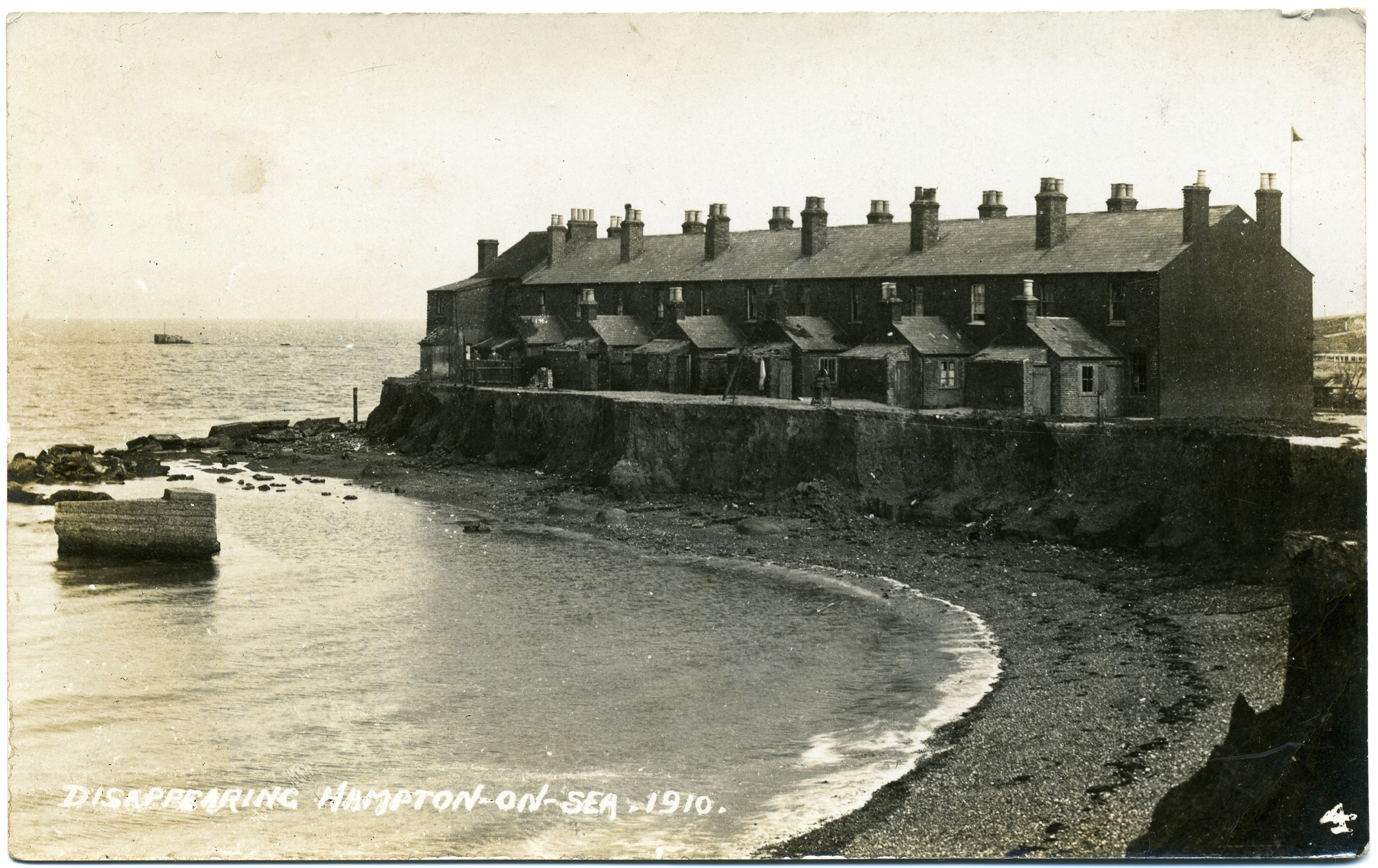
Hernecliffe Gardens before demolition, 1910

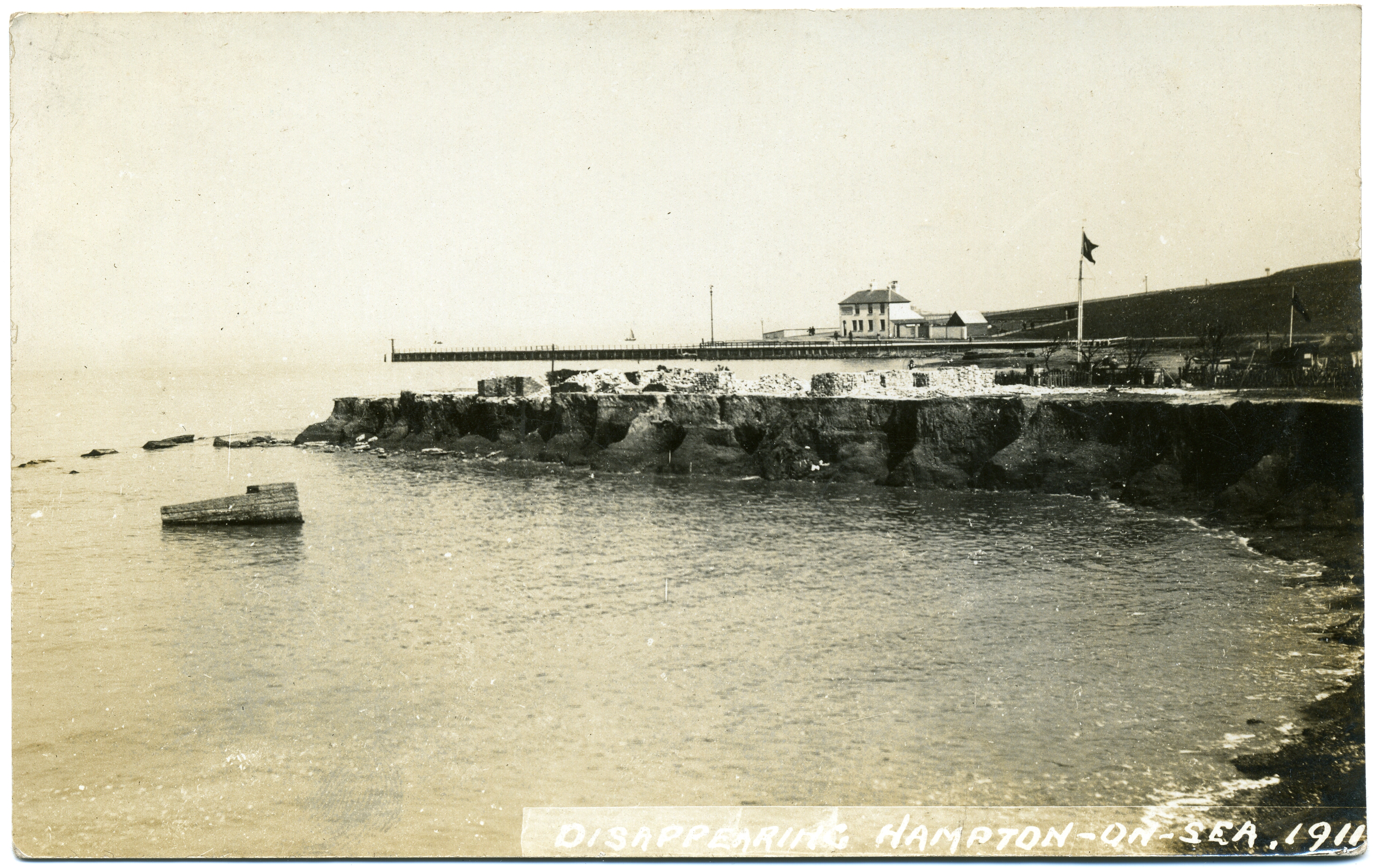
Hernecliffe Gardens after demolition, 1911

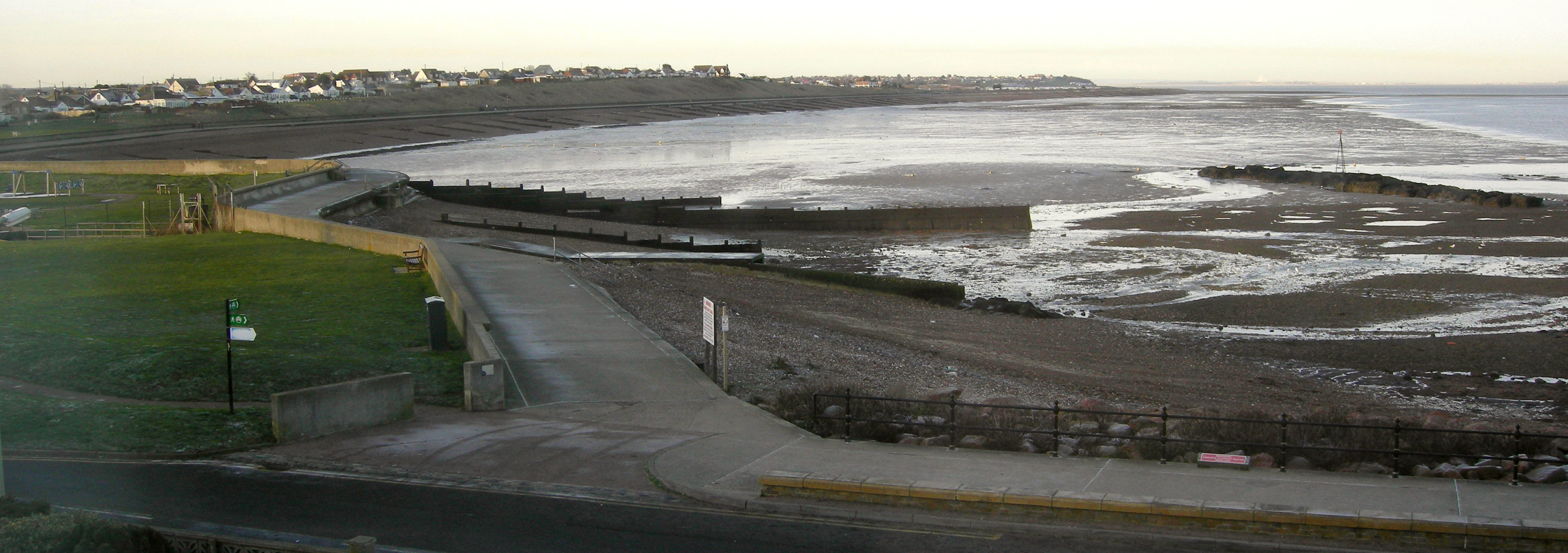
Whole site looking west, 2010

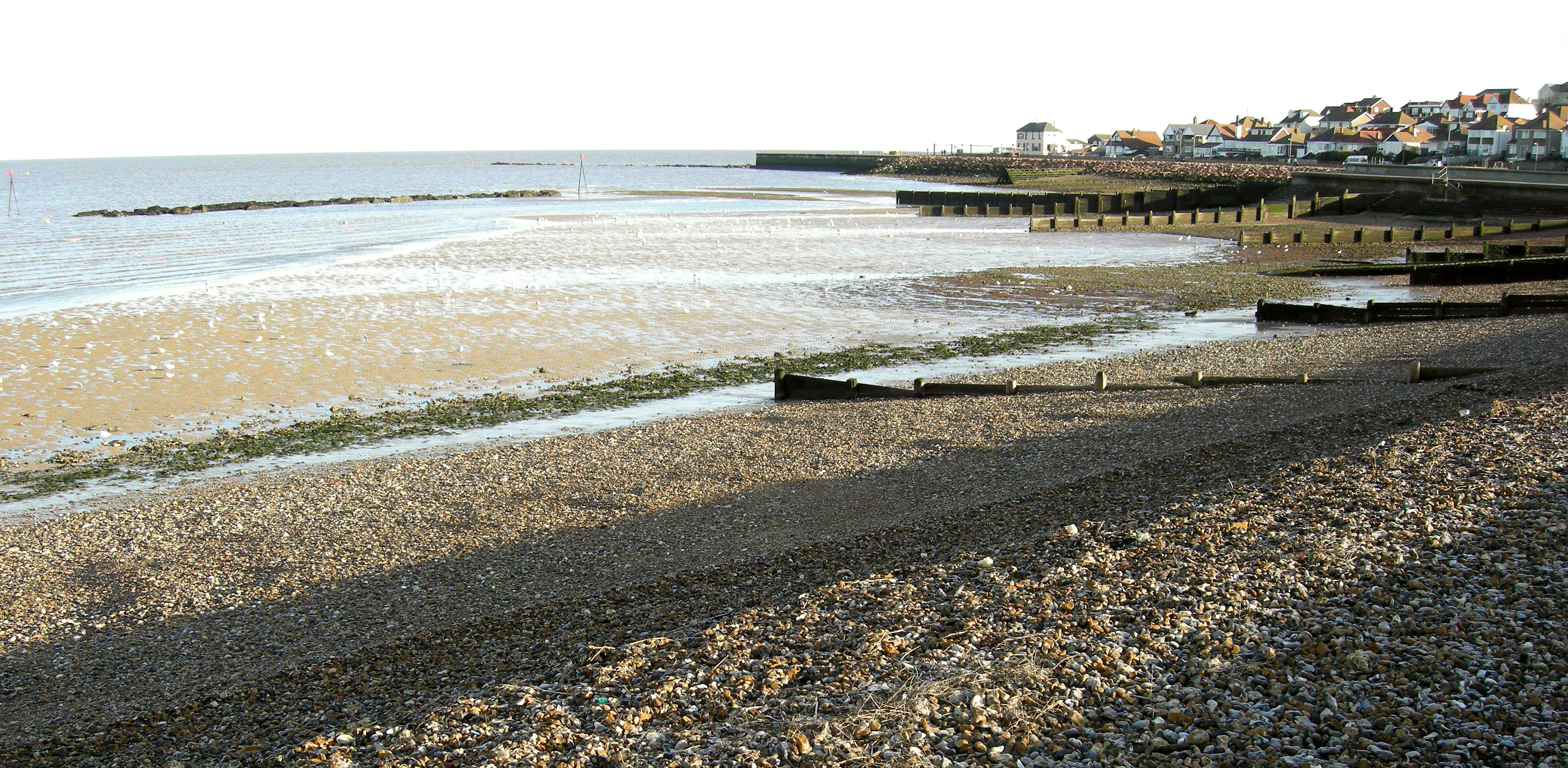
Whole site looking east, 2010

== In popular culture ==
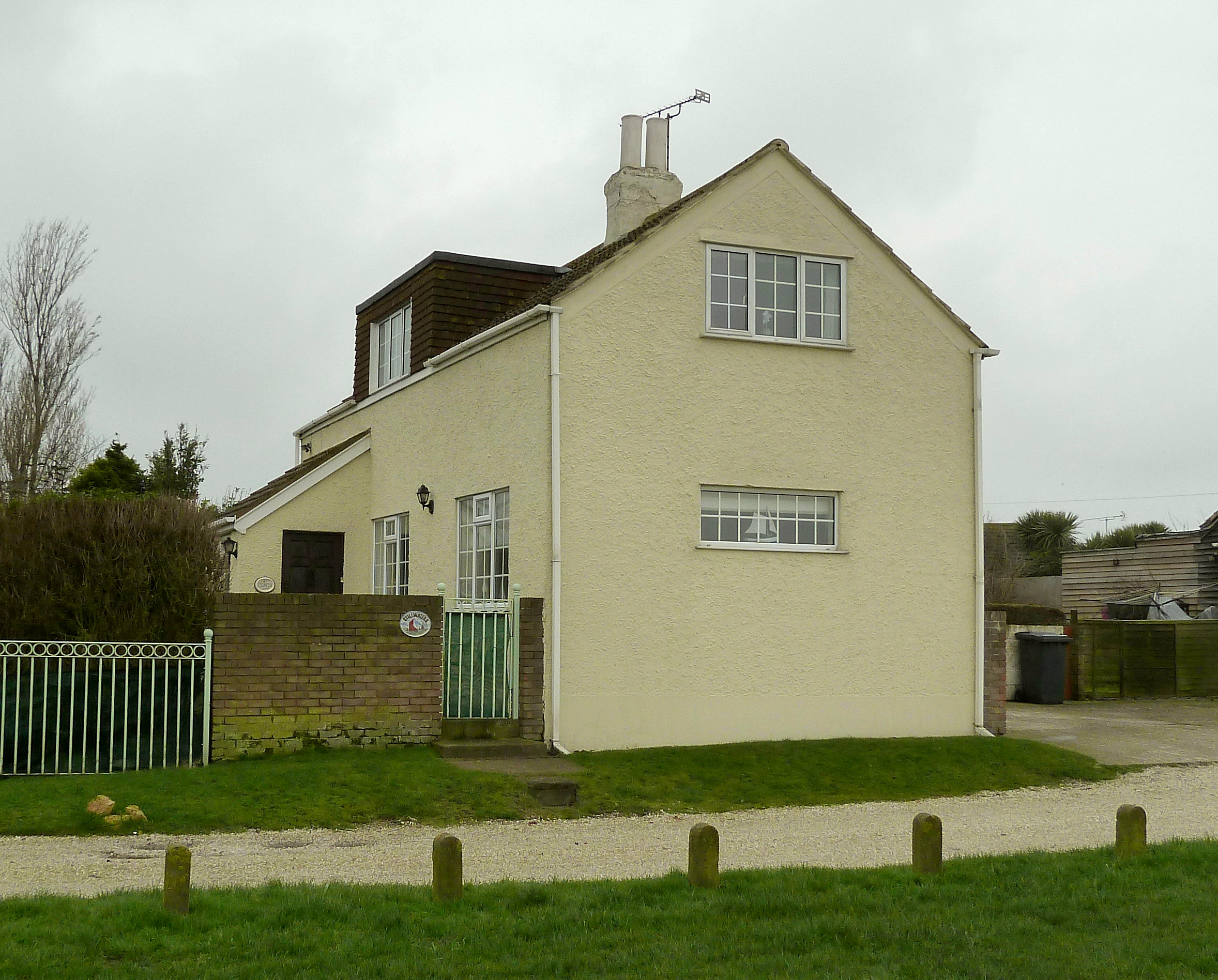
Stillwaters, fictionalised as Dilly Dally Cottage in Half-Term trail (1955)

Will Scott's 1955 children's novel Half Term trail is set partly in Hampton-on-Sea under the fictional name of West Bay, and it features Pleasant Cottage (later called Hampton Bungalow; then Stillwaters) in Swalecliffe Avenue under the name of Dilly Dally cottage. Hampton's cliffs before the erection of the 1959 defences are described thus:

"The first cliffs in West Bay are hardly cliffs at all. It's where the stream runs out across the beach, and you can stand on the sands and look over the edge of the cliffs without even standing on your toes. Farther along the cliffs are higher and crumbly and falling into the sea all the time, which was one reason why nobody wanted to buy Dilly Dally. A few more years and it would be in the sea along with the cliff."

== See also ==
- Coastal management
- Coastal erosion
- Beach evolution
- Abandoned village
- List of lost settlements in the United Kingdom

== Bibliography ==
- Easdown, Martin, Adventures in Oysterville: The failed oyster and seaside development of Hampton-on-Sea, Herne Bay (Michael's Bookshop, Ramsgate, 2008) (ISBN 9781907369148; Illustrated; no page numbers; copy at Herne Bay library) NB: pages are numbered for this article with the book's text starting at page 3.
- Gough, Harold, Herne Bay's Piers, (Herne Bay Historical Records Society, 2008) (ISBN 9781904661078; illustrated with numerous historical photographs; a posthumous publication for Gough who died in 2008)
