= Frederick Christian Palmer =

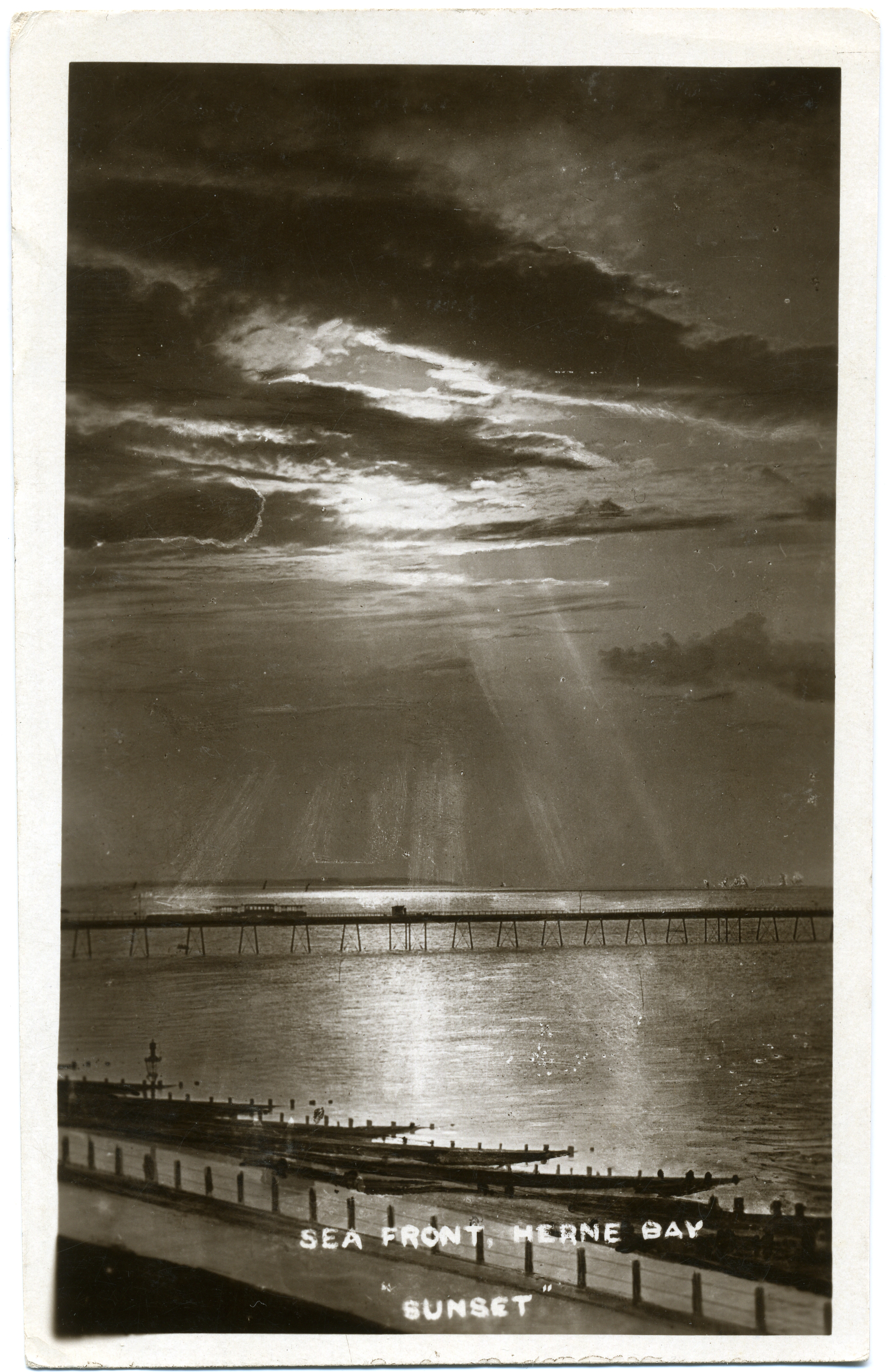
Sunset at Herne Bay, 1910–1916, by Fred C. Palmer. Probably taken from his studio window, using a filter to reveal clouds. The sun rays are enhanced by drawing on the glass negative

Frederick Christian Palmer (East Stonehouse, Plymouth 1866 − Hungerford 1941; fl.1892–1935), known professionally as Fred C. Palmer, was the main public photographer of Herne Bay, Kent in the early years of the 20th century, working from Tower Studio. He photographed all the civic events in Herne Bay before 1914, and made portraits of the eccentric Edmund Reid, the erstwhile head of Metropolitan Police Service CID who had investigated the Whitechapel murders and then retired to Hampton-on-Sea, Herne Bay. In 1913 Marcel Duchamp used Palmer's 1910 photograph of the illuminated Grand Pier Pavilion as found object art in his Note 78, part of his Green Box artwork. In the 1920s and early 30s, Palmer took over William Hooper's Cromwell Street studio in Swindon, again producing local postcards, photographing prominent people and doing freelance work for local newspapers and the council.

== Biography ==
=== Background ===
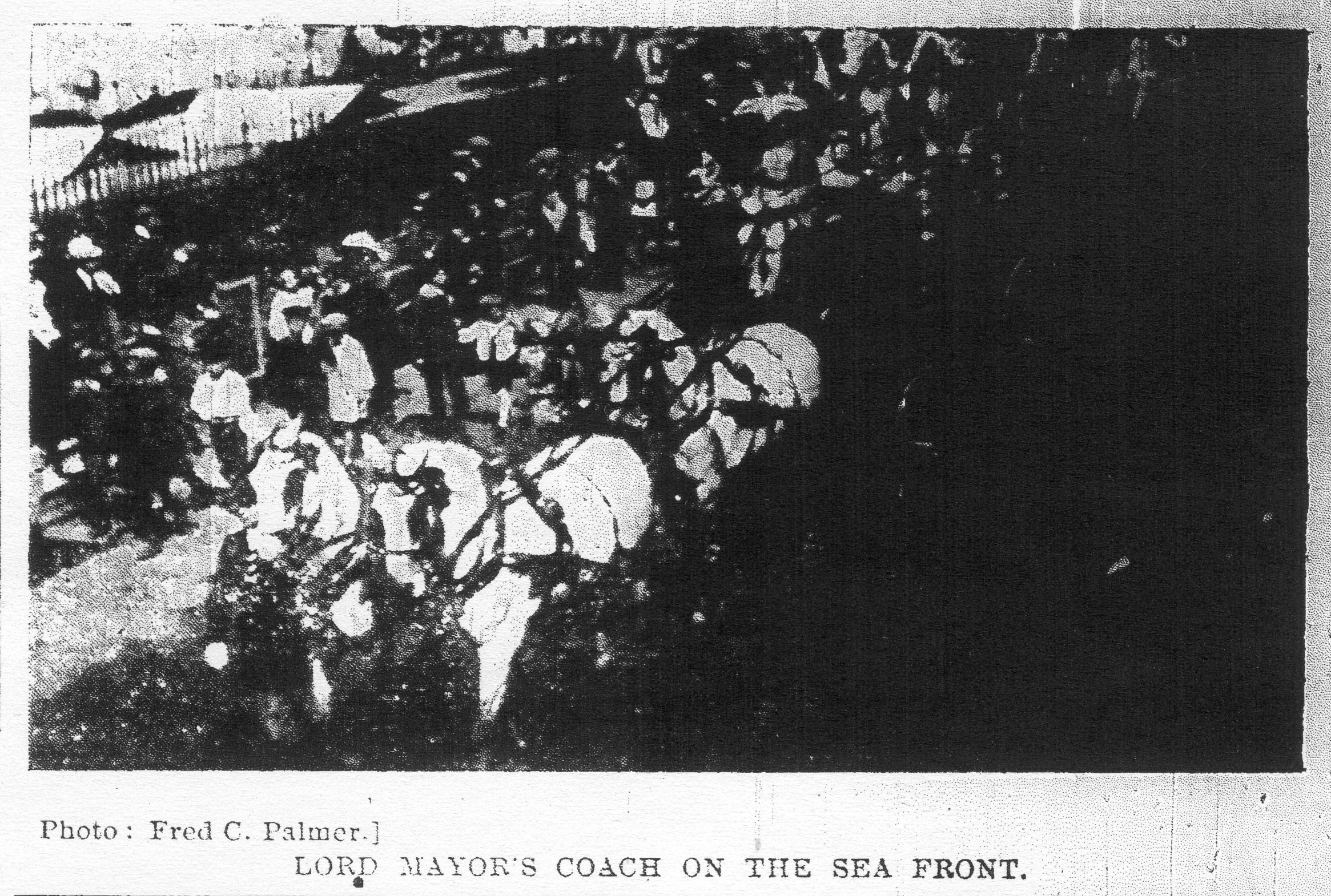
Lord Mayor of London's parade, Herne Bay 1910

Palmer was born at 31 Union Street, East Stonehouse, Plymouth on 9 January 1866, the son of Royal Navy bandsman William Eastman Palmer who had by then become a journeyman photographer. The name "Christian" came from the boy's grandmother Christian Branton Eastman Lewis, (Note: Born 1806 in Devon, widowed by 1851 (1851 census) and died 1866, East Stonehouse, aged 60) who married his grandfather Henry Palmer, a shoemaker, in Okehampton, Devon in 1826. Fred C's father W.E. Palmer married Maria Louisa Eales on 13 March 1860 and they were living in James Street, Stoke Damerel, in 1861 and ten years later at 13 Frances Street at St Andrew's in Plymouth. She was a "photographic artist", which could mean that she tinted or drew on prints from glass negatives or somehow enhanced daguerreotypes, and it was probably her influence which brought the profession of photography into the family. So W.E. Palmer became a photographer in the mid-1860s, and had twelve children including seven sons, at least five of whom were trained as photographers. The business was named William Eastman Palmer & Sons, and Frederick Christian was the third son. His brothers who trained as photographers were William George, John Eastman, Ernest Charles and Henry Reginald. (Note: Two brothers were not photographers: Albany Edward Palmer trained as an insurance clerk and Dudley Sidney M. Palmer's career is unknown.) In 1881 in East Barnet Fred C. was 15 years old and had started his photographic apprenticeship. In 1891 when Frederick Christian was 25 years old, he was still living at home and the family was at Hopetown Villa, Leicester Road, East Barnet. At that time his father William Eastman Palmer was still described as a journeyman photographer.

=== Adult life ===
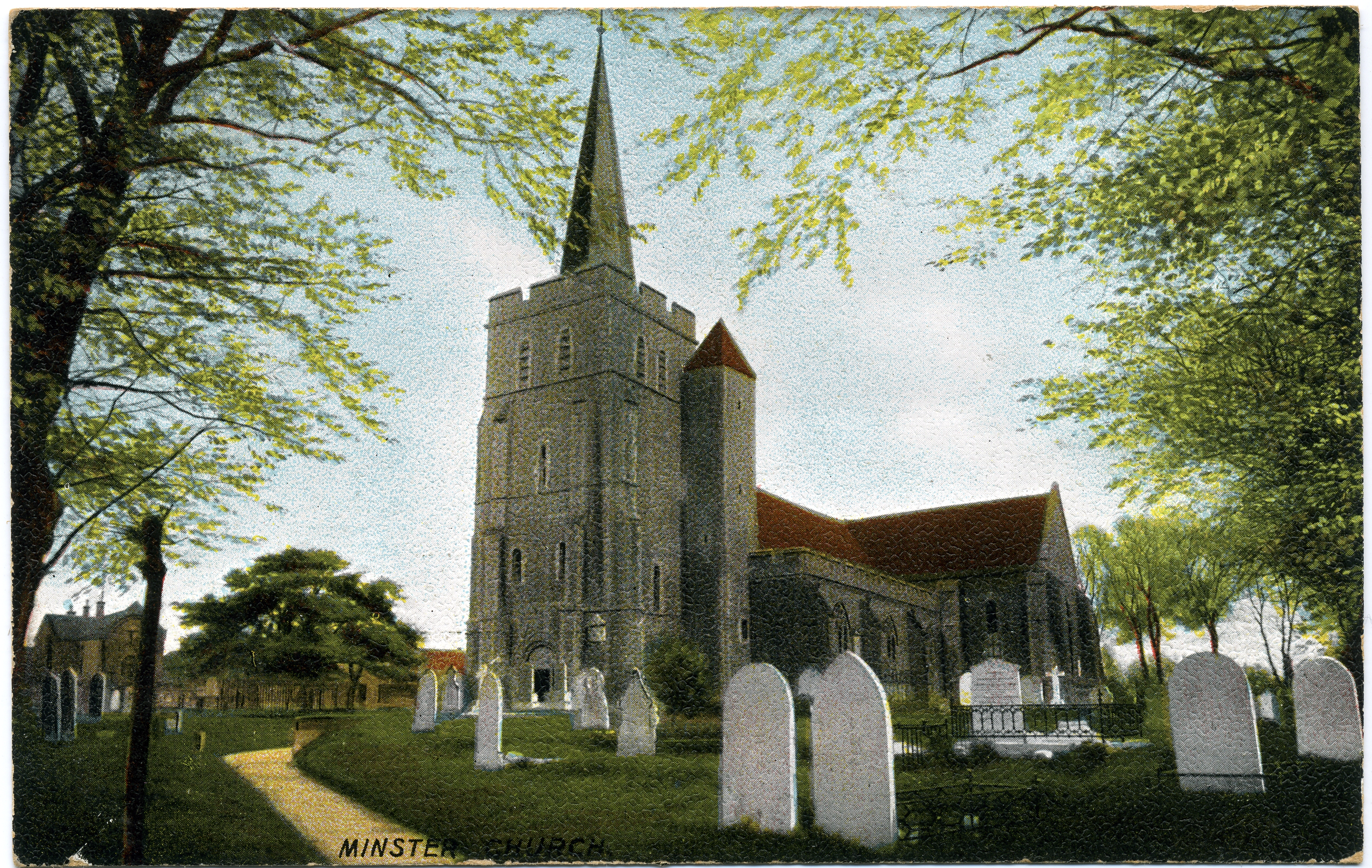
Church at Minster, Thanet, 1903–1904

In 1894 Frederick Christian Palmer was married in the parish of St George Hanover Square to Eleanor Florence M. Maltby, who had been born in Highbury in 1873. They had three children: Leslie Reginald, born 1896; Muriel Audrey, born in 1902; and Joyce Selwyn, born in 1905. The first two were born in Barnet, and the third in Herne Bay. In 1901 Frederick was practising as a photographer and the family was living at Gresham Cottage in Plantagenet Road in New Barnet. In 1911 they were all at Palmer's Tower Studio in Herne Bay; Frederick was again listed in the census as a photographer and Eleanor was assisting in the business. He may possibly have been related to Fred T. Palmer (fl.1890–1899), photographer of Ramsgate and Croydon.

Palmer may have moved to Watford around 1936–1937 but did not die there; (Note: The GRO ledger entry for the death of a Frederick Palmer in the second quarter of 1940 does not relate to him. The GRO ledger entry for deaths in 1940 says: "Frederick Palmer – Age 74 – June 1940 – 3a 1892 – Watford".) his daughter Muriel Audrey had married Charles William Raysbrook in 1925 in Strood and then had three children in Watford. He died on 14 March 1941, aged 75 years, of old age at The Grey Cottage, formerly Prospect House, at 1 Prospect Road, Hungerford. His death certificate gives his occupation as master photographer, retired. (Note: The term, master, in this context at that time implied that he had photographers working under him in a studio, and did not refer to a specific qualification. His son Leslie Reginald was present at the death, but it is not known whether The Grey Cottage was the residence of either father or son.)

== Professional life ==
=== Herne Bay ===
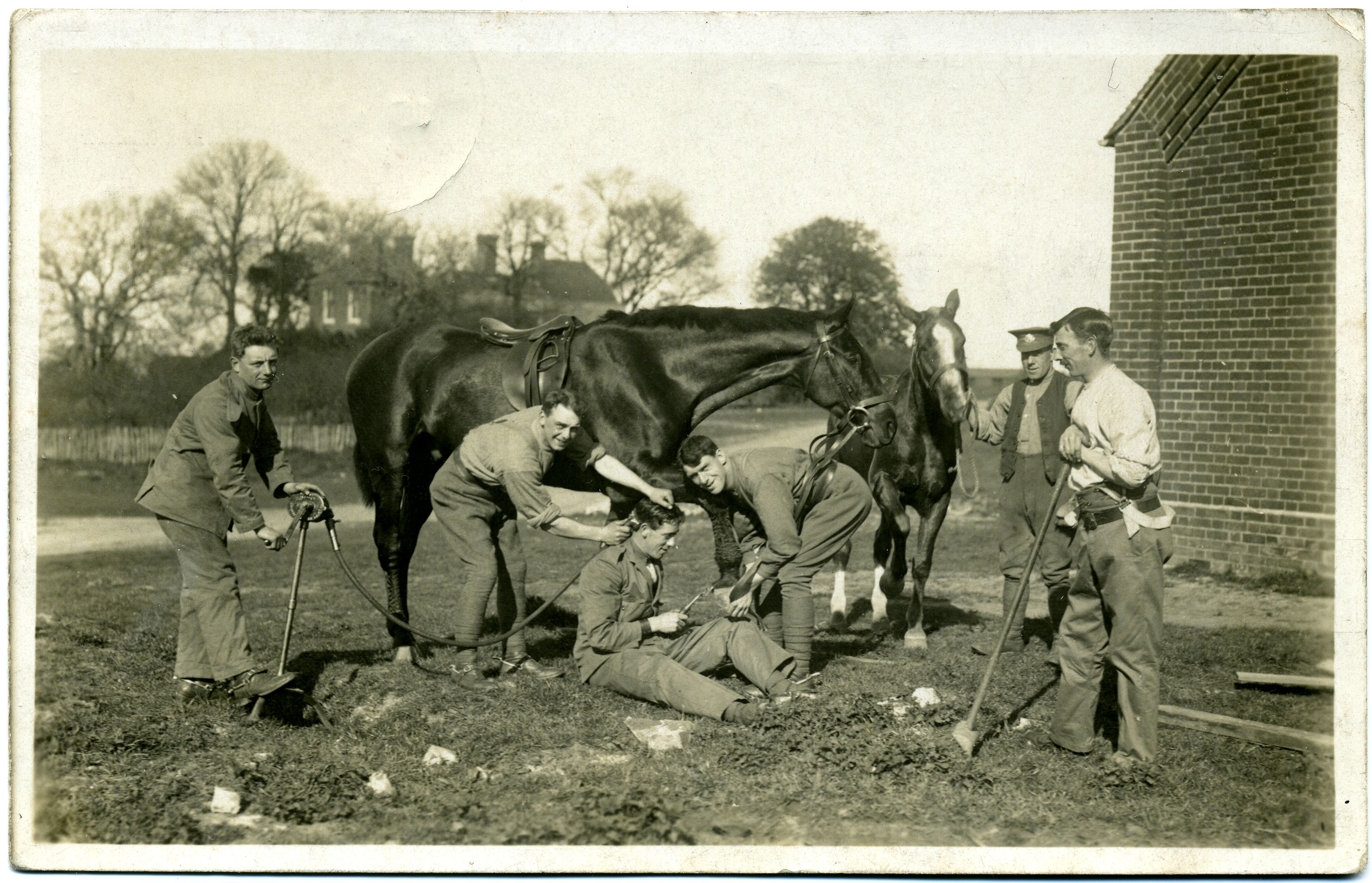
World War I soldiers

Although photographic film was available, it is probable that Fred C. Palmer used large−format glass negatives and that the postcards and portraits were direct prints from these, because of their fine detail. From 1892 to 1903 he was working for the family firm, William Eastman Palmer & Sons, at Bloom House, Leicester Road, New Barnet. From 1903 to 1922 he was working as a photographer and picture-frame maker in Herne Bay, at 21 High Street from 1903 to 1905 (where Kent Kebab is, as of 2011), and at Telford Villa, 6 Tower Parade from 1907 to 1922. Between 1910 and 1916, (Note: 1910–1913: Palmer is credited with Herne Bay Press photographs. 1910–1916: local Blue Book directories list Palmer at his studio in Tower Parade, Herne Bay, Kent. 1919–39: no obituary for Palmer is listed in Herne Bay Press. 1930–31: Blue Book lists a different proprietor at the Tower Parade studio. Four soldiers named Fred C. Palmer are listed in the National Archives as World War I dead. However it is not now thought that Palmer died between 1916 and 1919.) Fred C. Palmer was a freelance Herne Bay Press newspaper photographer, who worked from Tower Studio in Tower Parade on the Sea Front where he took portraits. He had a small shop or kiosk called The Art Gallery on the sea front, separate from the studio, where he sold postcards and portrait prints. (Note: Information from the Mount fishing family of Herne Bay, whose ancestors were photographed by Fred C. Palmer) He produced postcards of important town events, such as the grand opening of Herne Bay Pier's Grand Pier Pavilion by the Lord Mayor of London on 3 August 1910, and the grand opening of the King Edward VII Memorial Hall (Note: Today it is known as the King's Hall) by Princess Beatrice on 13 July 1913. (Note: His name was usually given as Fred C. Palmer in newspaper photograph credits and on the backs of his picture postcards.)

=== World War I ===
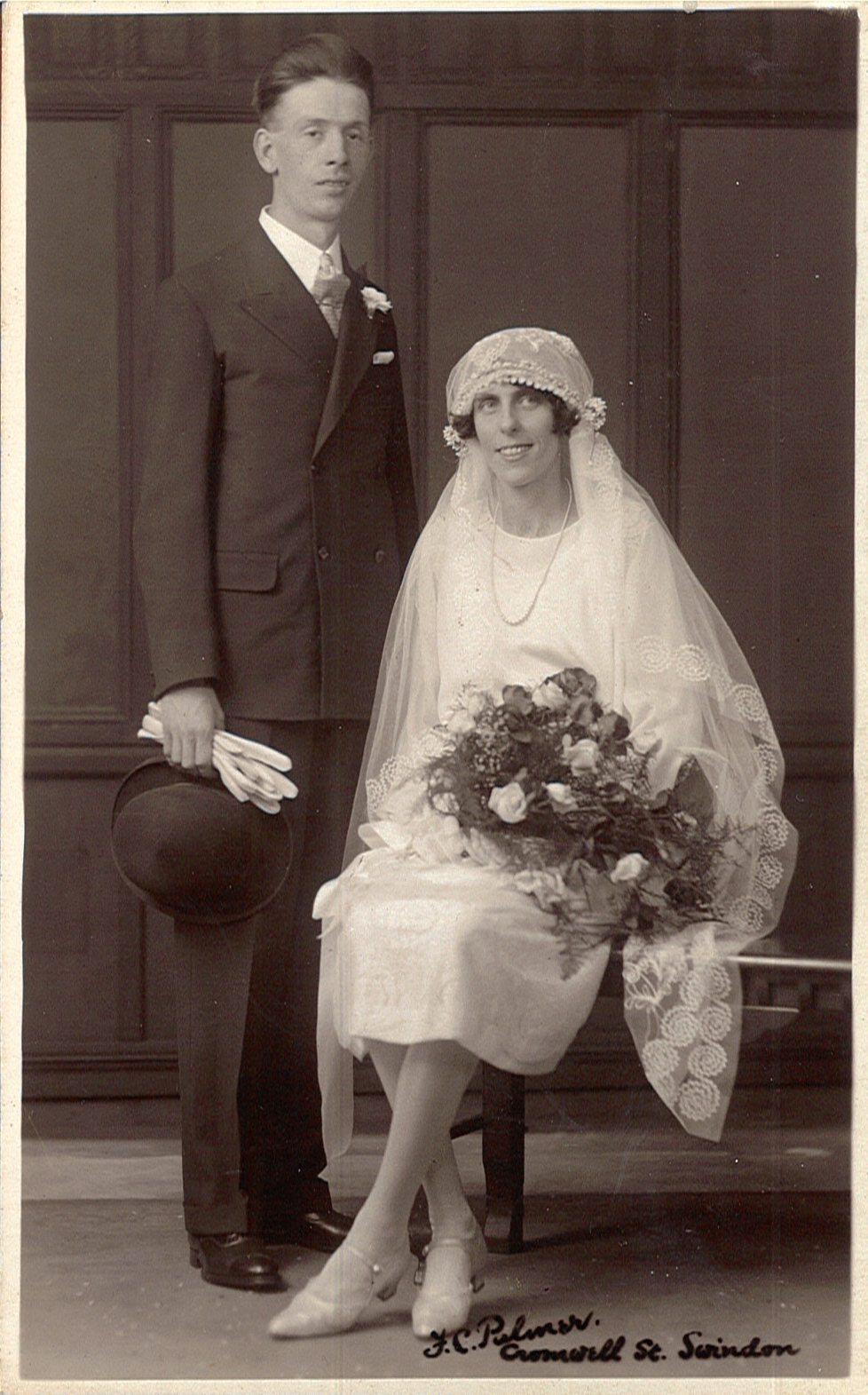
Swindon 1920s

During World War I there are no written records of Fred C. Palmer, but he did produce postcards of war-wounded Belgians recuperating in Canterbury and Herne Bay, of a possible 1914 recruitment rally and of soldiers larking about. (Note: See File:FCP Canterbury 006.jpg, File:FCP Herne Bay 007.jpg, File:FCP Herne Bay 008.jpg, File:FCP World War I horses 1915.jpg) There was a shortage of silver for use on photographic plates, (Note: his may be why he appears to have been limited to photographing the troops and war-wounded and perhaps other work until 1920.)

=== Swindon ===
Around 1920–1921 Palmer took over the studio of the established photographer William Hooper at 6 Cromwell Street, Swindon. Street directories state that he was there between 1923 and 1936. The building is now demolished. He published postcards and portraits and was freelance photographer for local newspapers; the same professional pattern as in Herne Bay before the war. Swindon Council used his photographs. He retired around 1936–1937 at the age of approximately 70 years, and died in 1941.

=== Photograph of Grand Pier Pavilion, 1910 ===
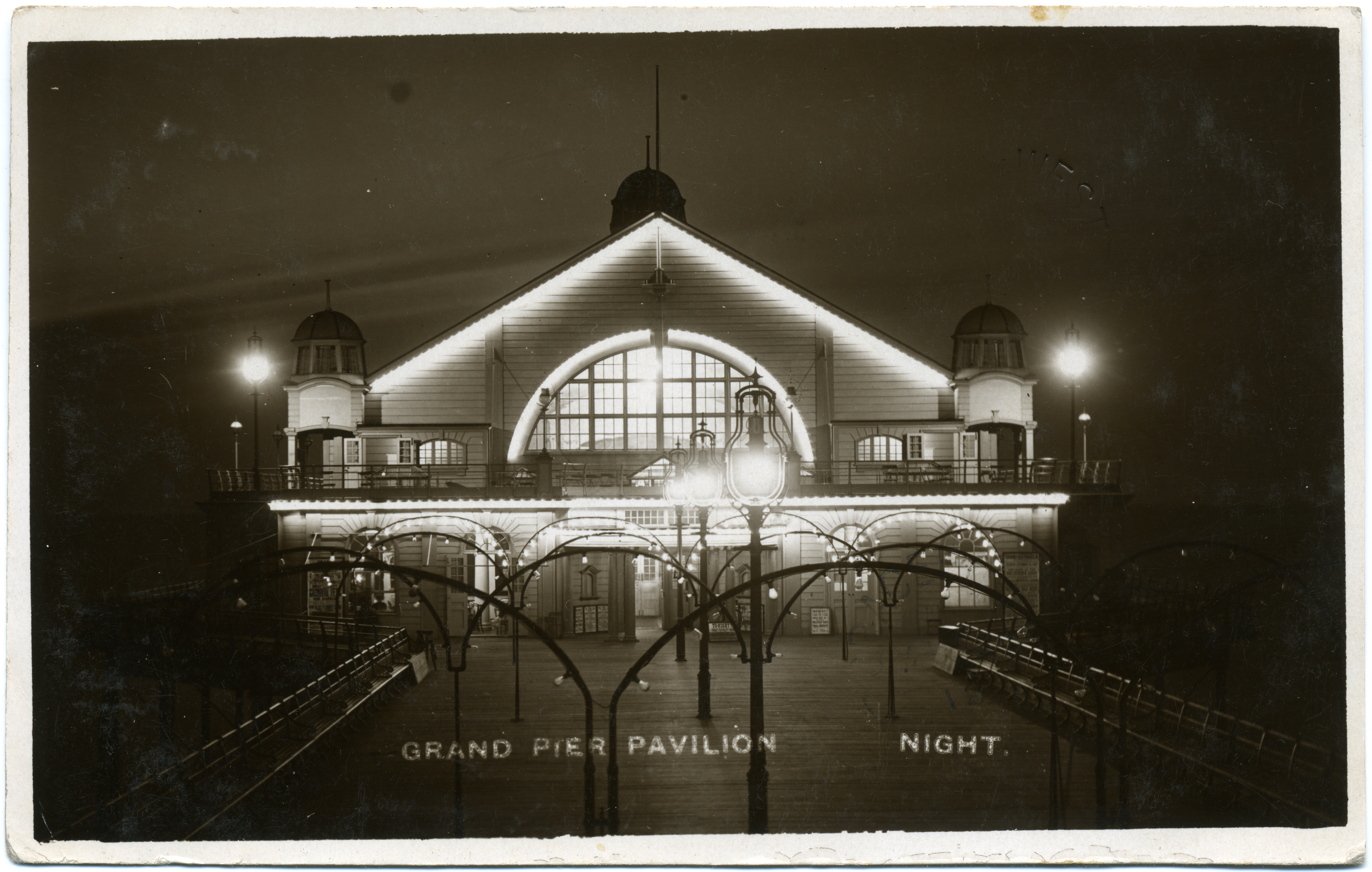
Scan of an original print by Palmer of the Grand Pier Pavilion Illuminated

Palmer's 1910 photograph of the illuminated Grand Pier Pavilion was incorporated as found object art in an artwork by Marcel Duchamp following the latter's visit to Herne Bay in 1913. Duchamp cut out Palmer's photo from a leaflet and attached it to Note 78 in The Green Box describing his plans for a work called The Large Glass (1915–1923). The notes including Palmer's photograph were published in two limited editions, and were considered part of, and not just an adjunct to, the Large Glass artwork.

In August 2013 a "Duchamp in Herne Bay 1913–2013" festival was organised in the town to celebrate and explore Duchamp's 1913 visit to Herne Bay and the relationship between that experience and his artwork. Palmer's postcard of the Grand Pier Pavilion, illuminated, was used to promote that festival.

=== Portraits of Edmund Reid ===
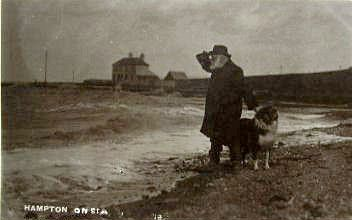
Edmund Reid by Palmer, 1912

In 1910–1912 Palmer photographed Edmund Reid who had been head of the Metropolitan Police Service CID at the time of the Whitechapel murders. Reid had retired to Hampton-on-Sea, a settlement which was fast sinking into the Thames Estuary prompting the old man to make attempts at publicity and to demand assistance from the council. Palmer photographed this eccentric character amid the progressing disaster and gave or sold the images to Reid in the form of postcards. The old man retailed Palmer's photographs from a kiosk, calling the collection an art gallery. Reid was mocked for selling postcards of himself and calling it art, but when Duchamp chose to take another Palmer photograph home in 1913 and made an artwork of it, (Note: Reid's insight was validated.)

== One example: the Ronald Cecil Concert Party postcard ==
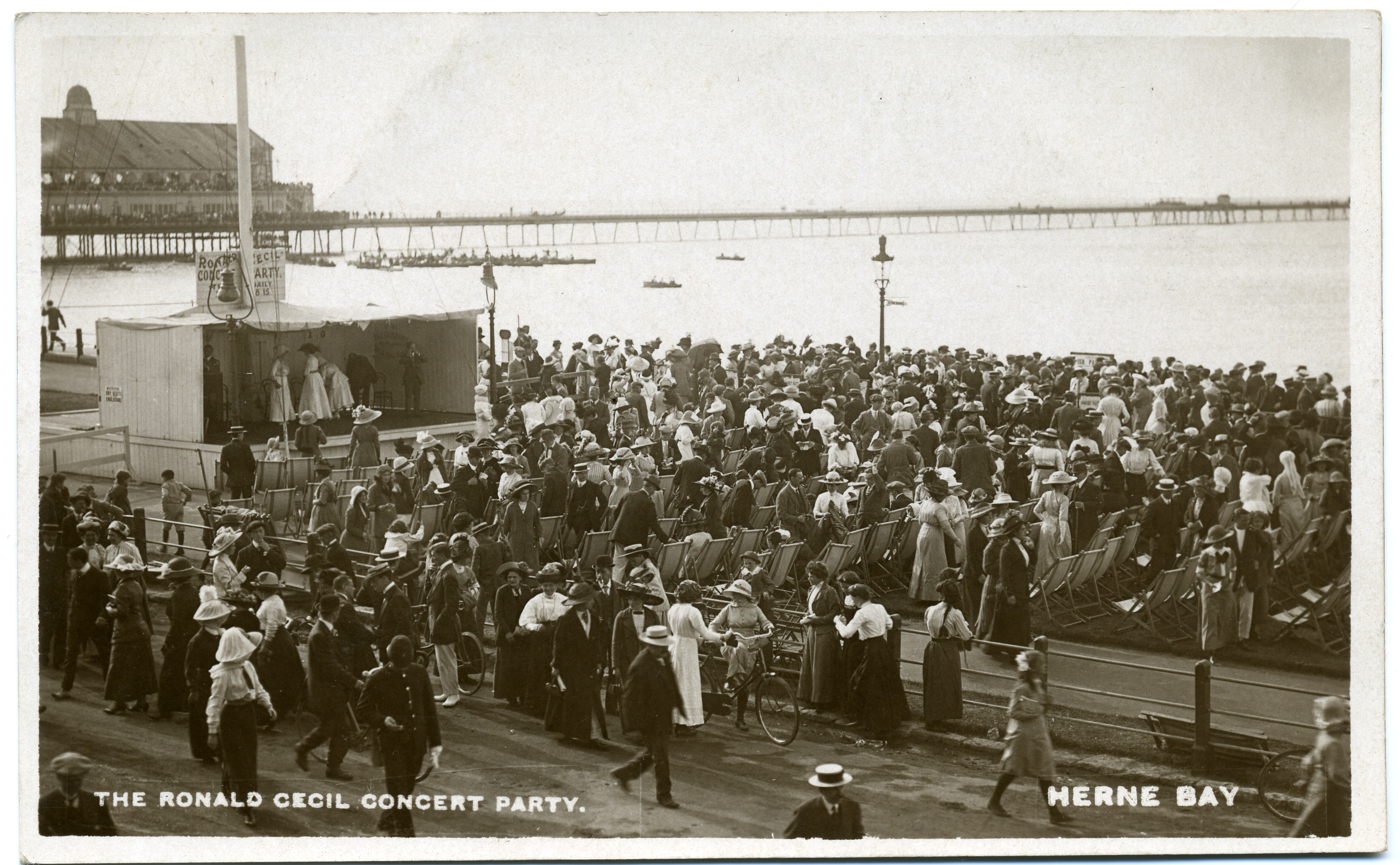
Ronald Cecil Concert Party postcard, ca.1913

The Ronald Cecil Concert Party postcard shows a crowd on the Herne Bay seafront around 1913, including rehearsed and choreographed tableaux vivants by actors. It was apparently produced in response to the contemporary eagerness of aficionados to collect and examine (with a hand lens) the detailed prints made from large glass negatives. The signature of such a postcard is the inclusion of tableaux signifying the fleeting moment, and in this example it is the running boy about to go out of frame on the left, (Note: Said by the servant Little Warner to be a boy from the St Georges Terrace school in Herne Bay.) and the policeman checking his watch in the foreground. The positions of the actors would be held still for the camera at a prearranged moment, which may have been announced by the chiming of the clock tower out of frame to the right, (Note: See File:Fred C Palmer 005b.jpg which shows the Ronald Cecil Concert Party stage positioned next to the clock tower.) or a call from the man on the right of the stage. Some of the tableaux are as follows:

(1) The suffragette mounting a bicycle and incidentally showing a little more ankle than such a young woman might intend at that time, in the right foreground. She is wearing black stockings, which in 1913 could signify a servant or actress. (2) The young man acting hot under the collar, apparently being berated by a woman, and exchanging a glance with a well-dressed and confident young dandy in sports jacket and white shoes, with one hand in pocket and the other possibly holding a cigarette. (3) Ronald Cecil himself apparently falling backwards in the crowd, although nobody around him turns to look. This is at the centre-back of the crowd. The viewer's attention is drawn to Cecil's fall by the insouciant young man standing below the lamppost in cap and three-piece tweed suit and arms akimbo, looking directly at Cecil falling. (4) Two housemaids – Gertrude Mabel Warner, known as Little Warner, and her fellow servant Ethel Maud Hollaway, both employed from age 12 by the boys' school at St George's Terrace – are walking in the aisle between the concert party audience and the fence. They are carrying posters or leaflets for the concert party, and were supposed to do something with the former, but were prevented by the presence of children. (Note: Information from Gertrude Mabel Warner, "Little Warner", 1896–1979. The regatta in the background suggests a Saturday, and the beams from the late afternoon sun passing through the windows on both sides of the Grand Pier Pavilion suggest a time of around 4.30pm. Among the public, a private nurse in uniform can be seen on the right, and the deckchair boys employed from age 12 are near the left foreground in the aisle between stage and fence.)

== Art gallery ==
Art gallery was Edmund Reid's name for his postcard collection of photographs by Palmer.

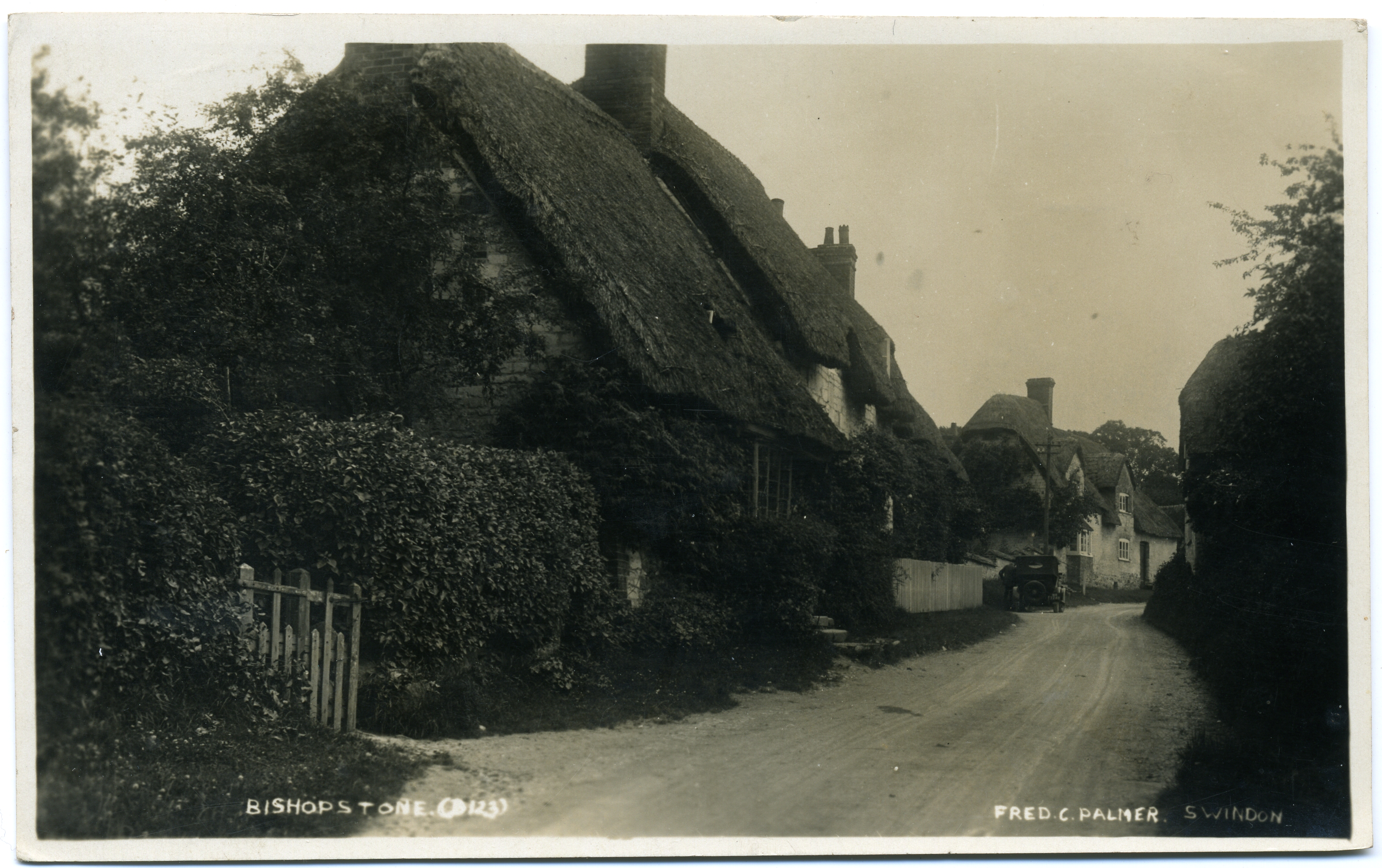
Bishopstone, Swindon, 1933

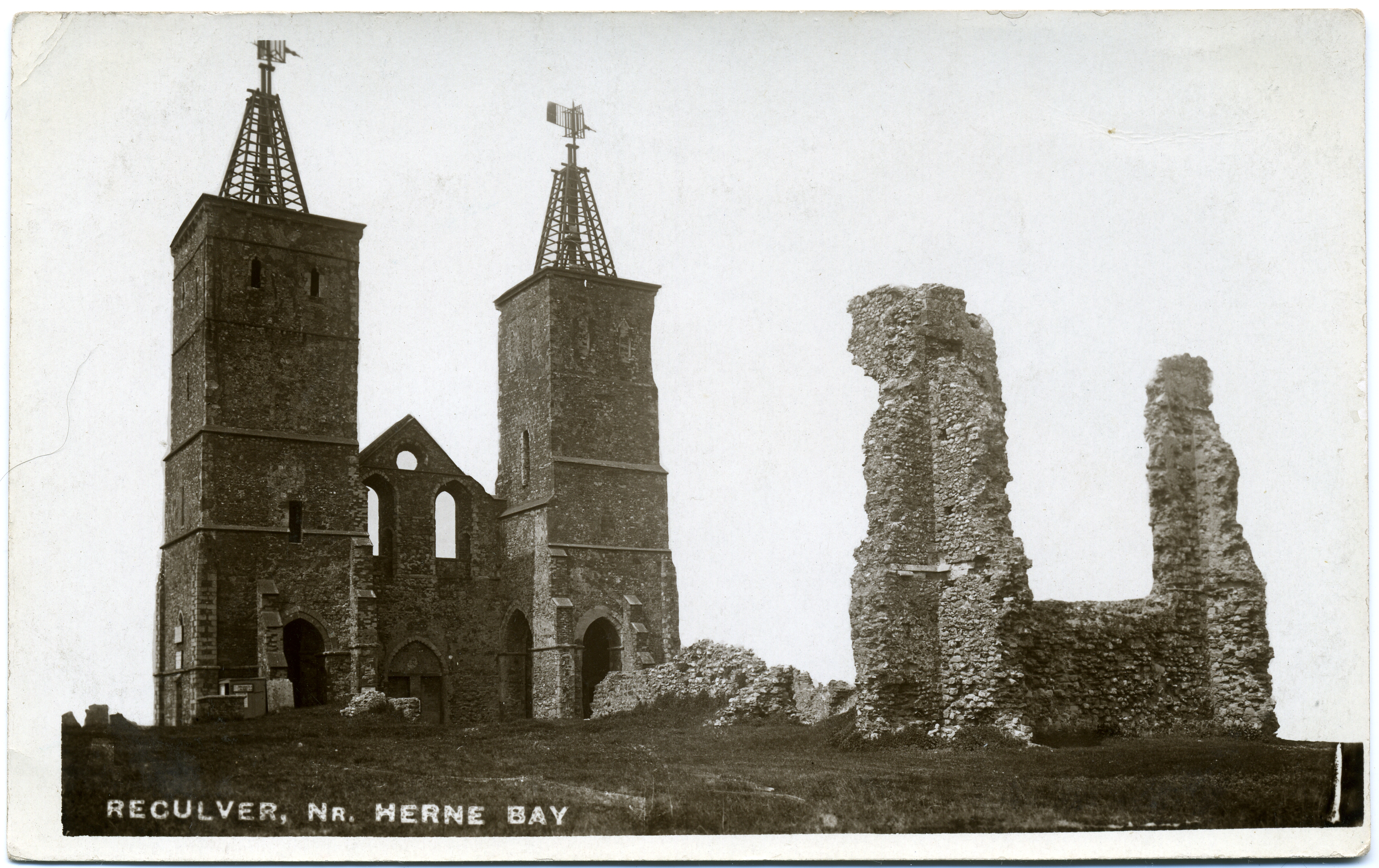
Reculver towers 1910−1916

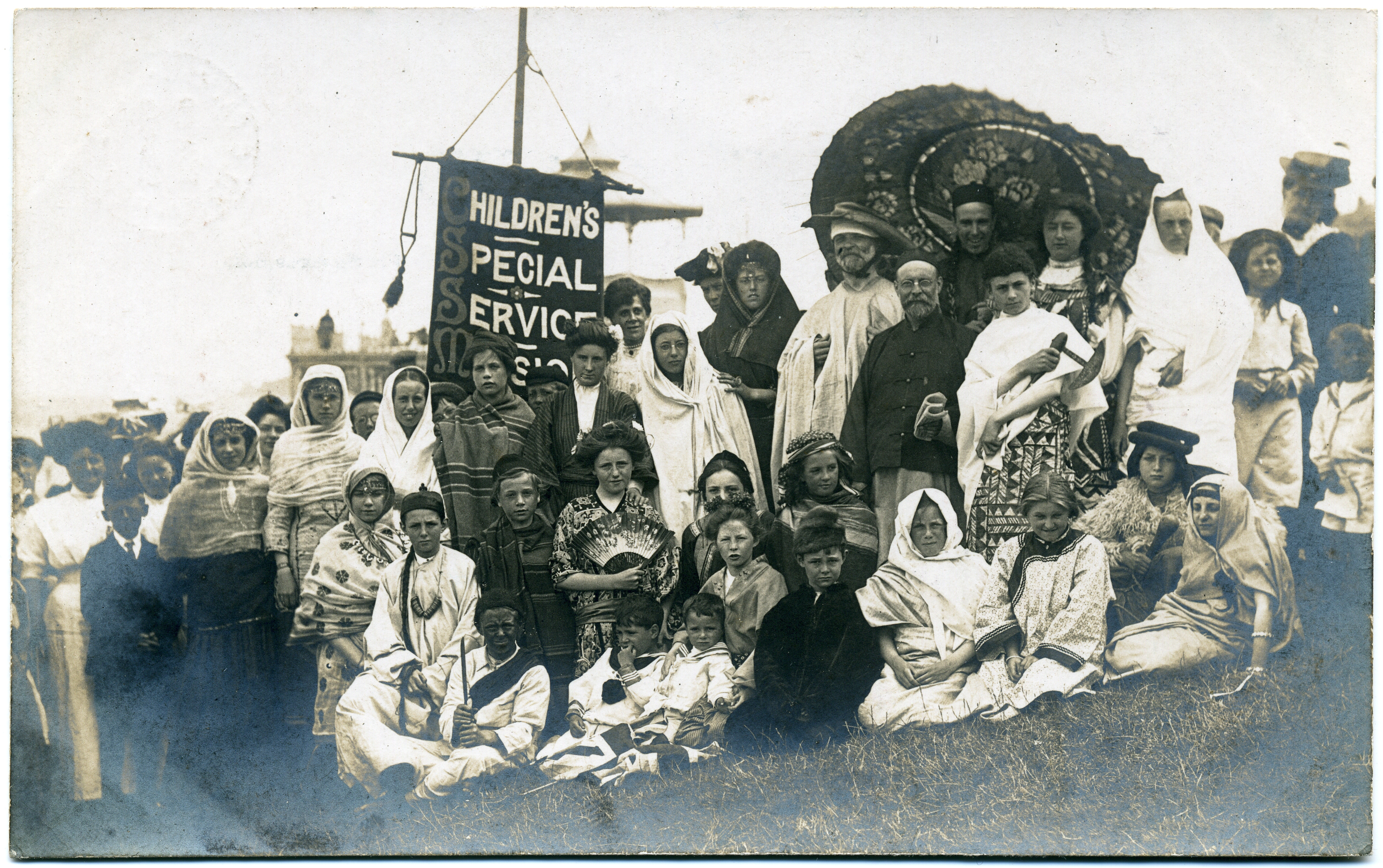
Children's Special Service Mission 1910−1916

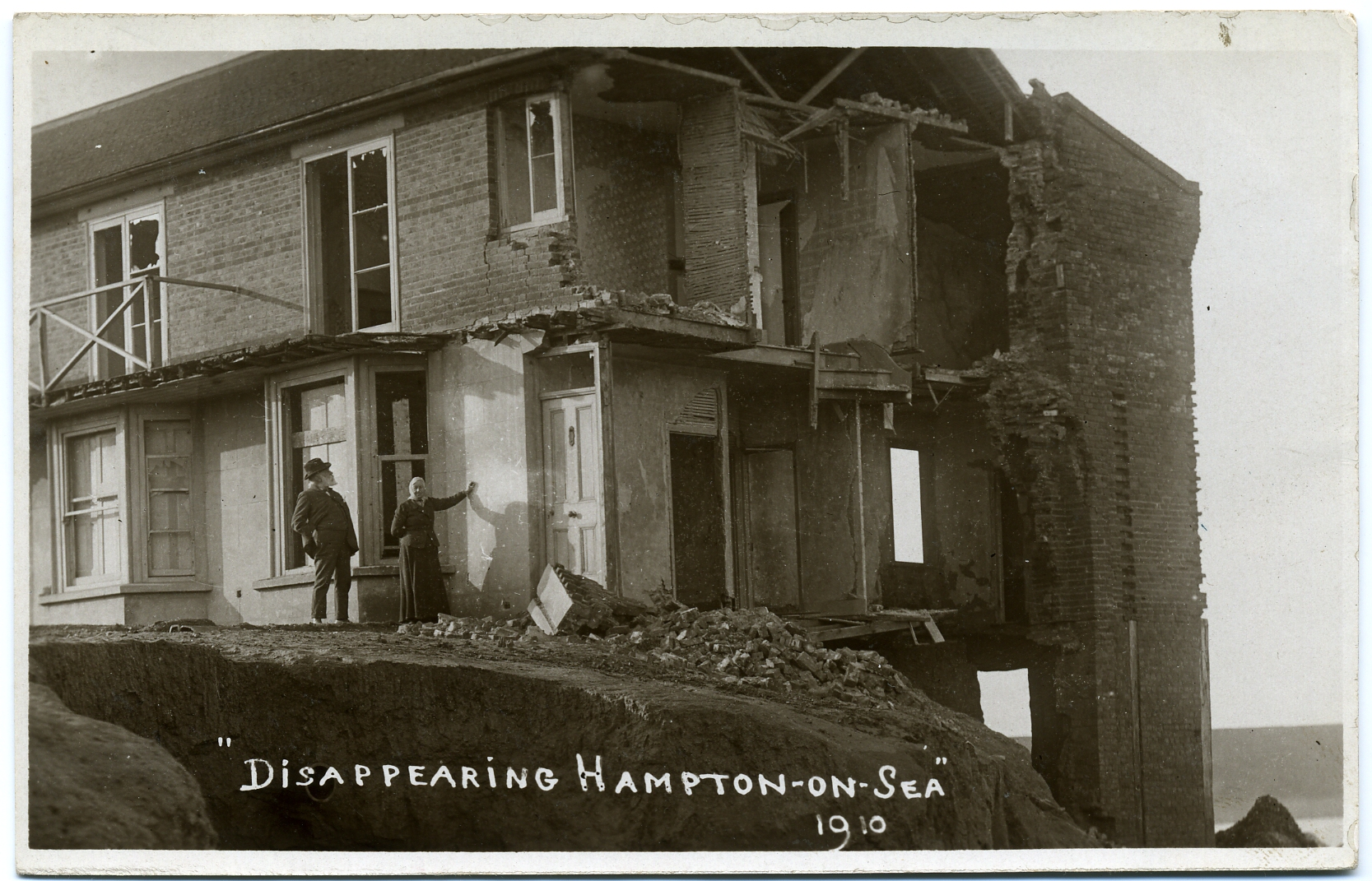
Disappearing Hampton-on-Sea, 1910

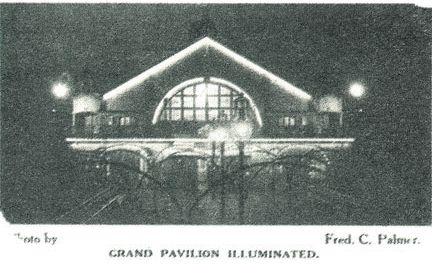
Grand Pier Pavilion illuminated, 1910: the image re−used by Duchamp after 1913

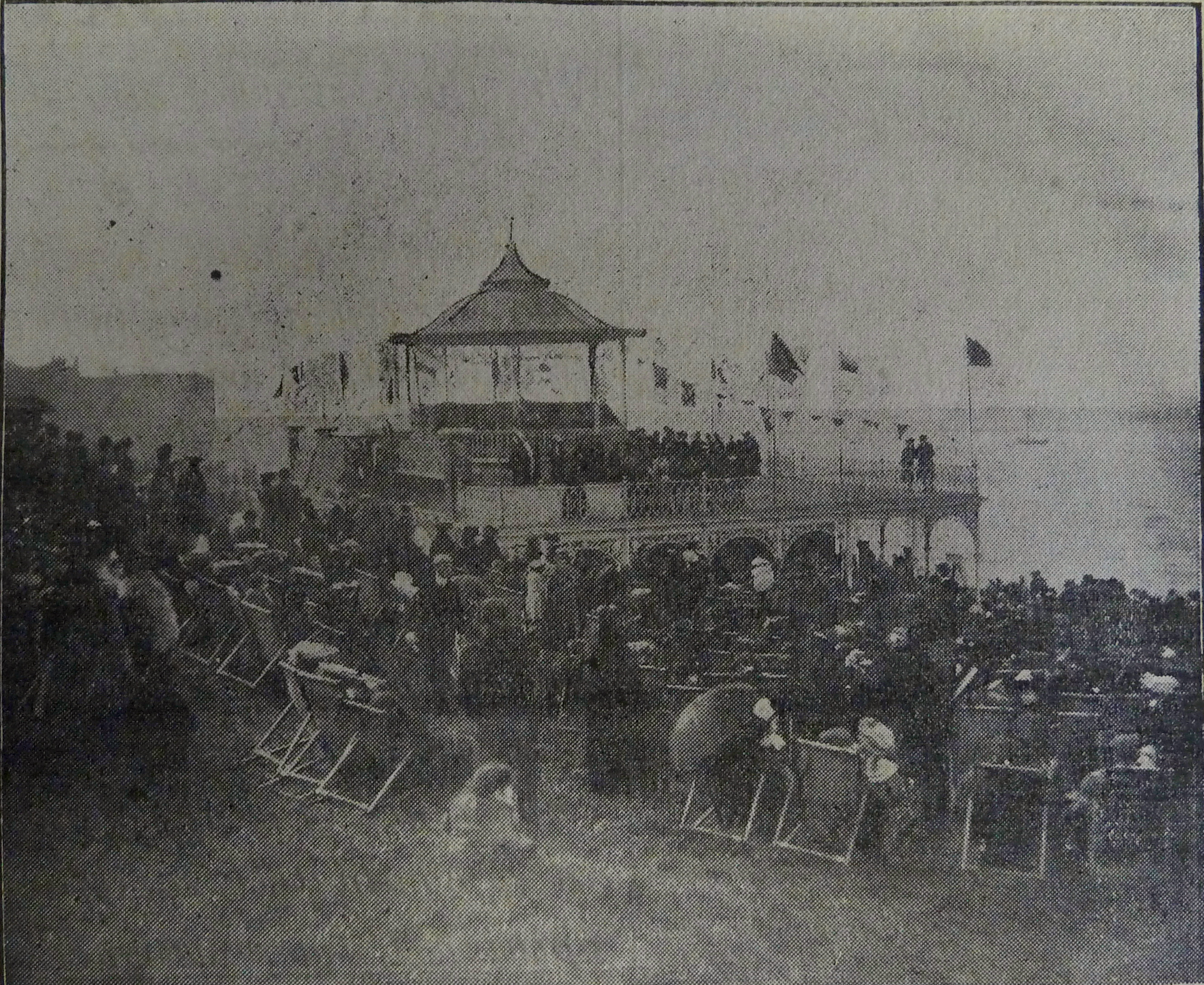
Palmer's newspaper photo of the opening ceremony of The King's Hall on 4 April 1904.
