= Edmund Reid =

British detective inspector

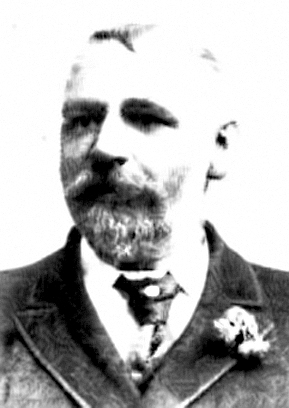
- Reid c. 1896
- Born: Edmund John James Reid; 21 March 1846; Canterbury, Kent, England
- Died: 5 December 1917 (aged 71); Herne Bay, Kent, England
- Occupation: Head of the CID in the Metropolitan Police's H Division
- Spouse: Emily Jane
- Children: 2

Detective Inspector Edmund John James Reid (21 March 1846 – 5 December 1917) was the head of the CID in the Metropolitan Police's H Division at the time of the Whitechapel murders of Jack the Ripper in 1888. He was also an early aeronaut.

== Police officer and aeronaut ==
Born in Canterbury in Kent to Martha Elizabeth Olivia (née Driver) (born 1827) and John Reid (born 1818), Edmund Reid was a grocer's delivery boy in London, a pastry-cook, and a ship's steward before joining the Metropolitan Police in 1872, with the warrant number 56100 and initially with the collar number P478. Reid was then the shortest man in the force at 5 feet 6 inches tall. In 1874 he transferred to the CID as a detective in P Division, and was promoted to Third-Class Sergeant in 1878 and Detective Sergeant in 1880. Around 1877 he made the first descent from a parachute from 1,000 ft at Luton. He was awarded a gold medal in 1883 from the Balloon Association of Great Britain to commemorate his record-breaking ascent in the balloon "Queen of the Meadow" from The Crystal Palace; he had already received the Association's bronze medal. In all, he made about 23 balloon ascents. In addition, Reid held "50 Rewards and Commendations from Magistrates and High Commissioners of Justice."

In 1885 Reid was promoted to Detective Inspector and was based at Scotland Yard. In 1886, he organized the newly formed J Division's CID Department in Bethnal Green, and by the time of the Jack the Ripper murders of 1888 he was the Local Inspector and Head of the CID at H Division in Whitechapel, having been appointed in 1887, and succeeding Frederick Abberline. In 1895 he transferred to L (Lambeth) Division.

Reid was "a Druid of Distinction and was awarded the Druids Gold Medal." In addition, he reached professional standards in acting, singing and sleight of hand. The Weekly Despatch described him as "one of the most remarkable men of the century".

== Jack the Ripper ==
Reid in 1888

Reid was the officer in charge of the enquiries into the murders of Emma Elizabeth Smith in April 1888, and Martha Tabram in August 1888, before Inspector Frederick Abberline was sent from Scotland Yard to 'H' Division in Whitechapel to co-ordinate the hunt for the killer. The Times of 12 November 1888 reported:

"Since the murders in Berner Street, St. Georges, and Mitre Square, Aldgate, on September 30th, Detective Inspectors Reid, Moore and Nairn, and Sergeants Thick, Godley, M'Carthy and Pearce have been constantly engaged, under the direction of Inspector Abberline (Scotland Yard), in prosecuting inquiries, but, unfortunately, up to the present time without any practical result. As an instance of the magnitude of their labours, each officer has had, on average, during the last six weeks to make some 30 separate inquiries weekly, and these have had to be made in different portions of the metropolis and suburbs. Since the two above-mentioned murders no fewer than 1,400 letters relating to the tragedies have been received by the police, and although the greater portion of these gratuitous communications were found to be of a trivial and even ridiculous character, still each one was thoroughly investigated. On Saturday (10th November) many more letters were received, and these are now being inquired into."

Reid's own theory was that the Ripper murders were committed by a drunk who lived locally, and who had no recollection of his crime. Interviewed in 1912 for Lloyd's Weekly News, he said:

"The whole of the murders were done after the public-houses were closed; the victims were all of the same class, the lowest of the low, and living within a quarter of a mile of each other; all were murdered within half a mile area; all were killed in the same manner. That is all we know for certain. My opinion is that the perpetrator of the crimes was a man who was in the habit of using a certain public-house, and of remaining there until closing time. Leaving with the rest of the customers, with what soldiers call 'a touch of delirium triangle,' he would leave with one of the women. My belief is that he would in some dark corner attack her with the knife and cut her up. Having satisfied his maniacal blood-lust he would go away home, and the next day know nothing about it."

Later in the same interview Reid said of the murders:

"I was the last C.I.D. inspector to be appointed by Sir Howard Vincent, and after about three years at Scotland Yard I was sent to form the detective department of a new division, the 'J,' which extended from Bethnal Green to Chigwell Hill in Essex. I remained there for twelve months, and was then sent to take charge of the Whitechapel division, where I found some exciting work in the series of 'Ripper murders'. Whitechapel has an evil reputation, and one that it does not deserve. During the whole time that I had charge there I never saw a drunken Jew. I always found them industrious, and good fellows to live among. Even the so-called 'Whitechapel murders' were not peculiar to that division, for one was in the City of London, one in Bethnal Green, four in Spitalfields, two in St George's, and only one in Whitechapel... I have been asked to tell the story of the 'Ripper' series many times, but to do so would necessitate the devotion of weeks of labour to the matter. But this I will say at once. I challenge anyone to produce a tittle of evidence of any kind against anyone. The earth has been raked over and the seas have been swept, to find this criminal 'Jack the Ripper,' always without success. It still amuses me to read the writings of such men as Dr. Anderson, Dr. Forbes Winslow, Major Arthur Griffiths, and many others, all holding different theories, but all of them wrong. I have answered many of them in print, and would only add here that I was on the scene and ought to know."

In 1903 he wrote two letters to The Morning Advertiser in which he stated that the Ripper was responsible for nine murders, that of Frances Coles being the last. He further stated that he did not believe that the Ripper was possessed of any surgical skill, holding the view that the wounds to the victims' bodies were merely slashes, inflicted even after the killer knew that the women were dead. He wrongly believed that 'at no time was any part of the body missing', and he also believed there was evidence that the Ripper's knife was blunt.

== Retirement and death ==
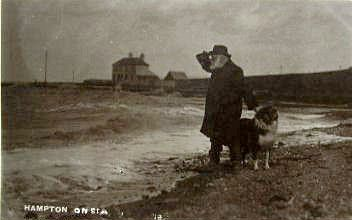
Edmund Reid at Hampton-on-Sea, by Fred C. Palmer, 1912

Retiring from the Metropolitan Police in 1896 aged 49 due to ill health, he became landlord of 'The Lower Red Lion' public house in Herne in Kent in March 1896, giving that up in October 1896 to set up as a private detective. In 1903 Reid moved into No. 4, Eddington Gardens at Hampton-on-Sea. He named his house Reid's Ranch, painted castellations and cannon on its side and soon became known as the eccentric champion of the Hampton-on-Sea residents, all of whom faced losing their properties due to sea erosion. His house contained a parrot and many photographs of his London cases. His garden contained a cannonball found on his property, a post from the end of the old pier and a flagpole with a union flag. From a wooden kiosk in his garden named the Hampton-on-Sea Hotel he sold soft drinks and postcards featuring himself photographed by Fred C. Palmer.

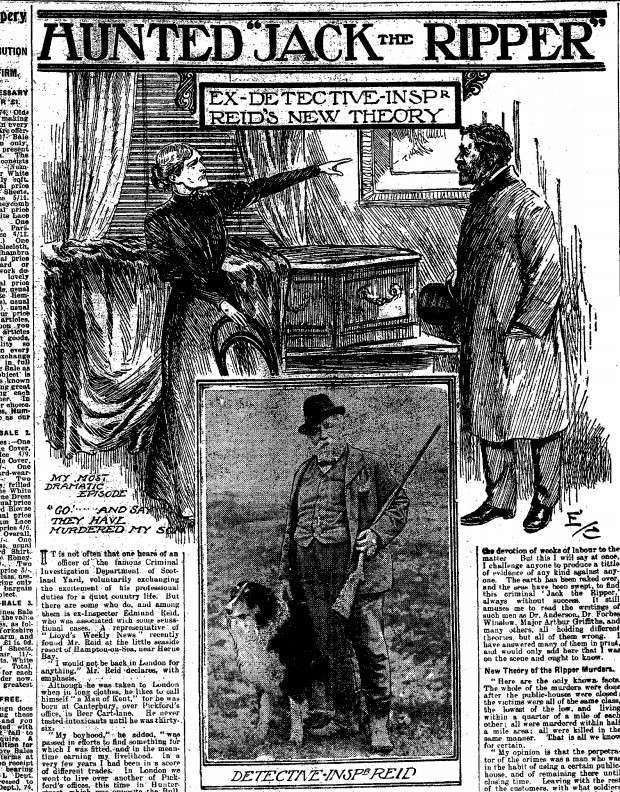
Reid interviewed in Lloyd's Weekly News, 4 February 1912

The sea flowed very close to his property, and in 1915 he was the last remaining resident of Eddington Gardens and of Hampton-on-Sea. He abandoned his house in 1916 due to sea erosion, moved to nearby Herne Bay, married again in 1917 to Lydia Rhoda Halling (1867–1938) and died aged 71 on 5 December of the same year of chronic interstitial nephritis and cerebral haemorrhage. He was buried in Herne Bay Cemetery in plot S62 on 8 December 1917.

With his wife Emily Jane (née Wilson) (1846 – 1900) he had a daughter Elizabeth (b. 1873) and a son, Harold Edmund J Reid (b. 1882).

== Media portrayals ==
During his lifetime Reid was the basis for ten popular "Detective Dier" novels written by his friend Charles Gibbon.

In the TV drama series Ripper Street, Reid is the lead character, played by Matthew Macfadyen. His family history is amended so that he and Emily only have one child, a daughter called Mathilda, who was lost and presumed deceased, some months before the series begins, in a river accident during the hunt for the Ripper. She is later found in series 3 and joins him in retiring to Hampton-On-Sea in the series 3 finale. However, the fictional Reid returns to Whitechapel following the emergence of another serial killer, and remains at the station at the beginning of the twentieth century.

== Sources ==
- Stuart Evans and Nicholas Connell, 'The Man Who Hunted Jack the Ripper: Edmund Reid Victorian Detective' Amberley (2010) ISBN 1848682603
