= Charles Gibbon =

British novelist

Charles Gibbon (1843–1890) was a British novelist specialising in popular romances.

== Life ==
Gibbon was born in the Isle of Man, and moved with his parents to Glasgow at an early age. After receiving elementary education there, he became a clerk, and then before age 17 found a position on a local newspaper. During Charles Kean's visit to Glasgow in 1860, Gibbon wrote an account of his acting, and Kean made his acquaintance. A year or so later Gibbon moved to London.

Poor health compelled Gibbon to spend his later years on the east coast of England, and he died at Great Yarmouth on 15 August 1890. He was married and left a family.

== Works ==
A three-volume novel Dangerous Connexions was published by Gibbon in 1864, which had a second edition in 1875. The Dead Heart followed in 1865, and Gibbon went on to publish some thirty novels, Robin Gray (1869; other editions 1872 and 1877) and For Lack of Gold (1871; other editions 1873 and 1877). Gibbon's Scottish novels have been compared with those of William Black. Ten novels featured "Detective Dier", a character based on Edmund Reid, who was a friend of Gibbon's. Gibbon's book The Braes of Yarrow (1881) is a historical novel about Scotland after the Battle of Flodden. By Mead and Stream (1884) is a rural romance.

Gibbon also edited The Casquet of Literature (6 vols. 1873–4), and wrote a Life (2 vols. 1878) of George Combe, in whose theories he was interested.

== Notes ==
Attribution:

This article incorporates text from a publication now in the public domain: Lee, Sidney, ed. (1901). "Gibbon, Charles (1843–1890)". Dictionary of National Biography (1st supplement). Vol. 2. London: Smith, Elder & Co.
