= Whitstable Oyster Festival =

Food festival in Kent, England

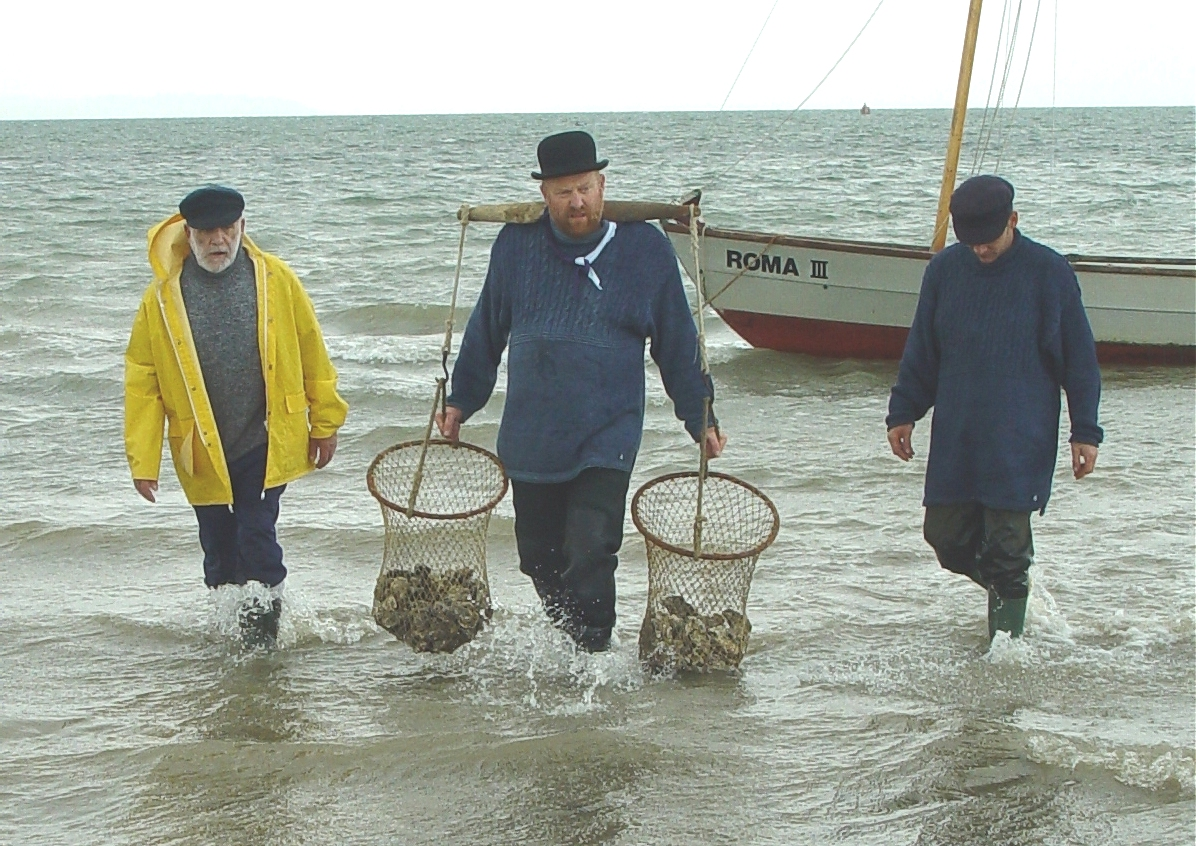
Landing of oysters on the first day of the Whitstable Oyster Festival 2007

The Whitstable Oyster Festival (now known as the Whitstable Rocks Oyster Festival) is an annual event that includes entertainment, music and activities, that is held in Whitstable, Kent, England, celebrating the town's links with the oyster industry.

Whitstable has been known for oysters since Roman times. During Norman times, Whitstable was celebrated in the name of St. James of Compostella, the unofficial patron saint of oysters, by fishermen. Whitstable was an important part of the oyster cultivation trade by the 17th century and by the 1850s, 80 million oysters were being transported to London's Billingsgate Fish Market from Whitstable. The modern festival was started in the 1980s to celebrate the town's history and links to the industry. The event typically attracts both local people and tourists/visitors.

In 2025, the festival lasted for three days in September and began with a firework display. The landing of the oysters celebration is a tradition that dates from 1657 which sees local fishermen bring in the first catch of oysters and a blessing of the seas takes place. The festival also includes a Mud Tug O’ War, oyster eating competition, music, street food, parades, family activities, and local food vendors. Stages for the event were located at the Grading Shed, the Lobster Shack and the Oyster Shed, with local pubs including the Old Neptune and the Coach and Horses also hosting live music. The organisers of the event include the Whitstable Oyster Fishery Company, the Whitstable Oyster Festival Association, and The Event Umbrella.

In some previous years the festival was held in different summer months, over a longer number of days, and included cookery workshops and an outdoor cinema. The festival was scaled back in 2017 as it had become very popular and there were concerns it was growing too large for the town. Other past year highlights have included a children's treasure hunt, an arts and crafts workshop using the sea wall as a canvas and a group foraging walk, led by an expert.
