= Henry Warde =

Henry Warde may refer to:

- Sir Henry Warde (British Army officer, born 1766) (1766–1834), British Army general and colonial governor
- H. M. A. Warde (Henry Murray Ashley Warde, 1850–1940), British Army officer and Chief Constable of Kent

== See also ==
- Henry Ward (disambiguation)
