= King's Hall, Herne Bay =

Concert hall in Herne Bay, Kent, England

The King's Hall
- East Cliff Pavilion (1904); Pavilion or Bandstand (1904–1913); King Edward VII Memorial Hall (1913–1920)
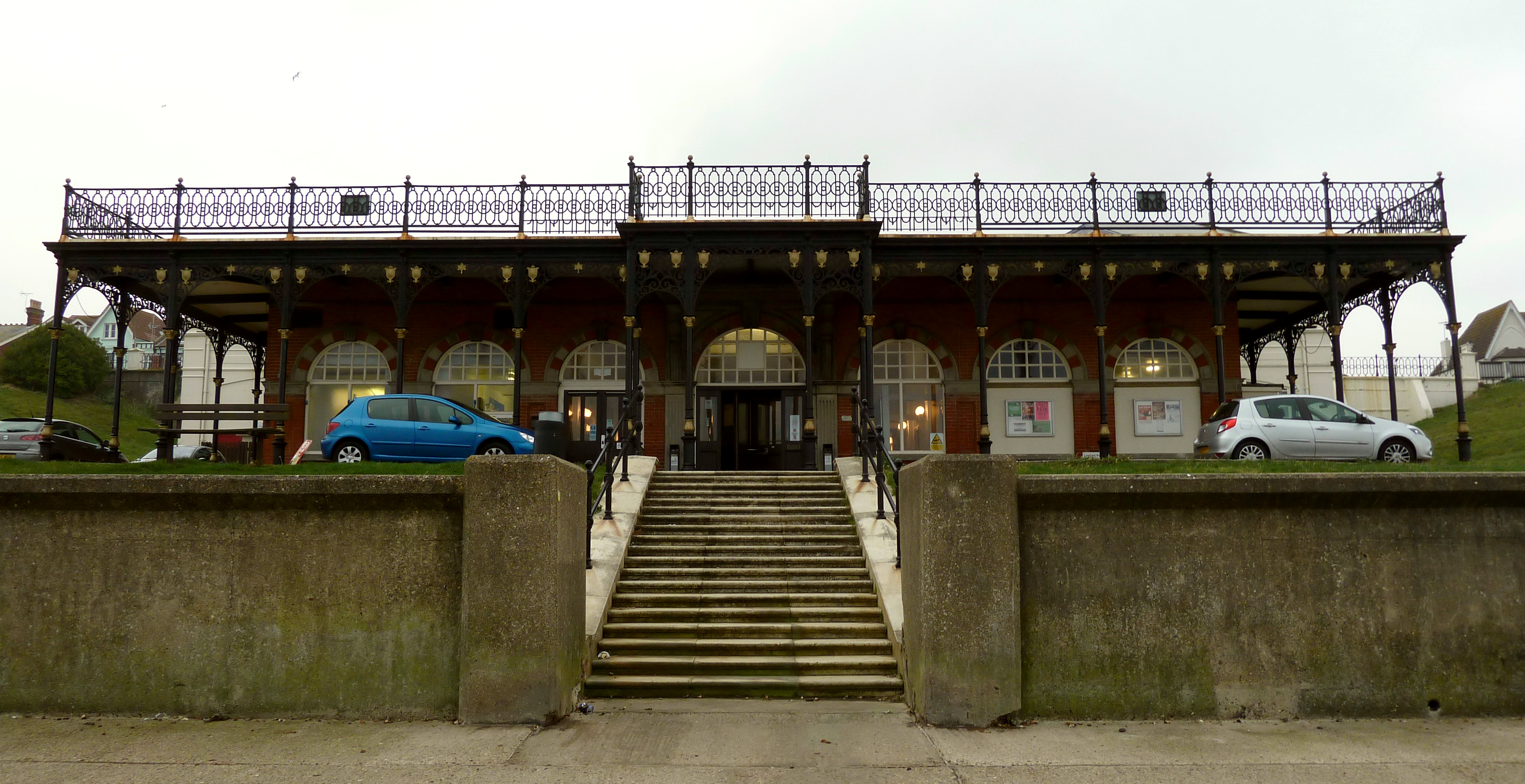
- The King's Hall, 2011
- Interactive map of The King's Hall
- Address: Beacon Hill, Herne Bay, Kent, England CT6 5BA
- Coordinates: 51.3728°N 1.1367°E
- Owner: Canterbury City Council
- Operator: Canterbury City Council
- Capacity: 250–500
- Type: Provincial
- Current use: Concert, dance and entertainment venue

Construction
- Opened: 4 April 1904 (cost £4,000)
- Rebuilt: 10 July 1913 (cost £6,000)
- Architects: F.W.J. Palmer, CE

Website
- TheKingsHall.com

The King's Hall is a theatre, concert hall and dance hall at Herne Bay, Kent, England. It was built as The Pavilion in 1903–1904, developed as the King Edward VII Memorial Hall in 1913 in memory of the late king, and was being called The King's Hall by 1912 while still at planning stage. Both building phases were designed by the local council surveyor F.W.J. Palmer, CE. The year 2013 was the centenary of the completion of the second and final phase of this building and its grand opening by Princess Beatrice on 10 July 1913.

== Location, name and site ==
The King's Hall is built into the Downs on East Cliff at the east end of Herne Bay, Kent. Before 1903, the Downs on East Cliff was a grassy slope down to the sea which during the Napoleonic Wars held a gun position and military camp. The Downs was later held by Herne Bay Urban District Council as a place of recreation. The first phase, the Pavilion of 1904, was intended as an improvement of a previous bandstand on the same site. This phase was called the East Cliff Pavilion at its opening, to differentiate it from the Grand Pier Pavilion (1910–1970). It later became the Pavilion or Bandstand. The second phase, or King Edward VII Memorial Hall of 1913, was being called The King's Hall in the local newspapers even before the ground was broken in 1912.

== Pavilion or bandstand ==
=== Mr Thomas Dence the donor ===
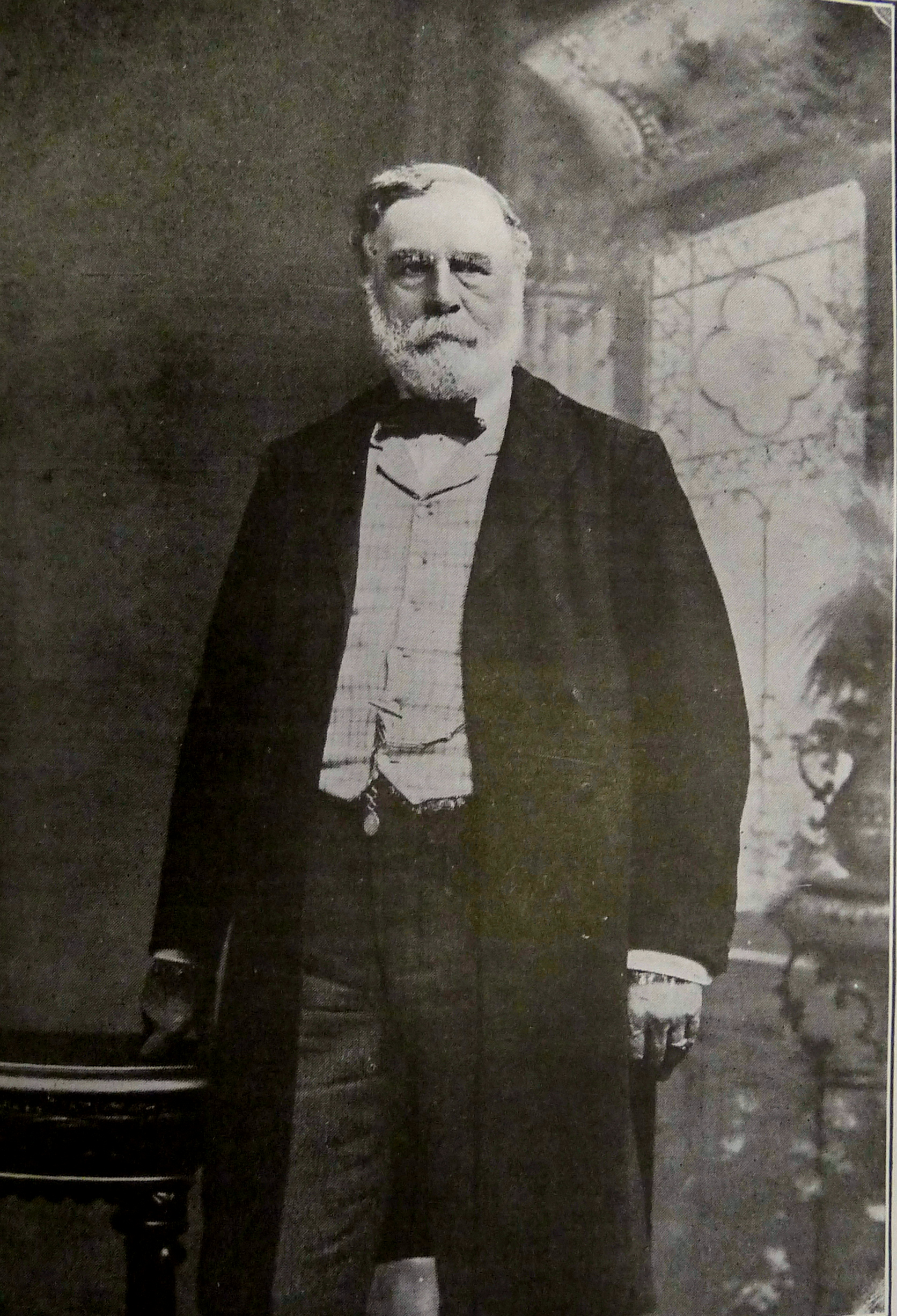
Thomas Dence who paid for the Pavilion, 1904

The original building was a bandstand funded in 1903–1904 by Thomas Dence, (Note: Thomas Dence (1840–1918).) a local developer who had been involved in the Frome Park Estate in Stroud Green and roads in the parish of St Mary, Islington, and owned property in Herne Bay. Dence had moved to Herne Bay for his health, bought the Downs, laid out roads at the top and built himself a house on Beacon Hill close by. He conveyed the remaining sloping land back to the council, and in 1901 and 1903 suggested plans for a bandstand. He had in mind:

"The erection of a pavilion on the east cliff for the use of residents and visitors. Its accommodation . . . should include a roofed in verandah shelter facing the sea, a large reading room intended to be supplied with newspapers, ladies' and gentlemens' lavatories, rooms for attendants, and drinking fountains . . . Band performances might at the discretion of the Council be permitted in the public hall, but no beach minstrels, or conjurors, or variety entertainments . . . The Urban Council should instruct their surveyor to prepare plans and specifications for this pavilion to cost £2,000, the plans to be so arranged as not to interfere with the view of residences then and thereafter to be erected on Beacon Hill."

The council was expected at its own cost to provide, prepare and level the site, to provide the design and specification, to superintend the erection, and to provide control, upkeep and management. It also had to place a stone in front of the building saying: "East Cliff Pavilion presented to the town of Herne Bay by Thomas Dence 1902." Dence would pay up to £2,000 for erection, fixtures, and the builder's invoices. Due to a new estimate by the council surveyor and to site-preparation costs, Dence finally agreed to pay £3,745 in all, although the final cost as announced at the Pavilion's opening was £4,000. The completed building was handed over formally by Dence to the council on Easter Monday, 4 April 1904.

Dence was an entertaining speaker, as can be seen by the speech he gave on Opening Day. He said that "the original design of the building was a rough sketch by his daughter, with all the features he sought to include in the building. This was handed by him to Mr Palmer . . . who prepared the present design in all its manifold details." He said to great applause that the Pavilion was "built so strongly and solidly, and on such good foundations that it was likely to stand the fierce north-easterly breezes for generations yet to come," and that "while the East Cliff Pavilion remained, Mr Palmer's name would ever remain." He said that Mr Ingleton's building work had done him great credit and that he "must have put the best materials in it for the love of it." On the subject of the popularity and health-giving properties of the town, he suggested to much laughter that because 1,000 and 1,400 persons were listed in the town directory in 1902 and 1904 respectively, Herne Bay could have 200,000 inhabitants in the year 2000. He wanted to press for gardens and walks on the East Cliff, and for a nearby park.

=== Mr F.W.J. Palmer the architect ===
Frederick William J. Palmer, CE, (1864–1947) was Surveyor to Herne Bay Urban District Council from at least 1891 to 1915. During these years he reconstructed all the main roads, rebuilt the council offices and Hampton Pier and constructed a new sea wall. He sewered the East Cliff and nine miles of private roads at the east end of Herne Bay. He planned and oversaw both phases of The King's Hall.

=== Mr A.S. Ingleton the builder ===
Alfred Sneller Ingleton was a builder, contractor, surveyor, and a road and sewer contractor. He was born in Sturry in 1857, married Sarah Milgate in the district of Blean in the summer of 1877, and died in Faversham in 1924 aged 66. In 1881 he was living in Sturry with his wife, in 1891 he was living in Herne, and in 1901 and 1911 he was living at Claremont, Canterbury Road, Herne Bay. In 1905 he was in charge of repairs to Herne Bay Clock Tower when a clock weight fell on an employee and killed him. In 1913 he was carrying on business as builder and contractor at 5 High Street, Herne Bay. By 1922 he had retired to 3 St Annes Road, Faversham.

=== Pavilion construction ===
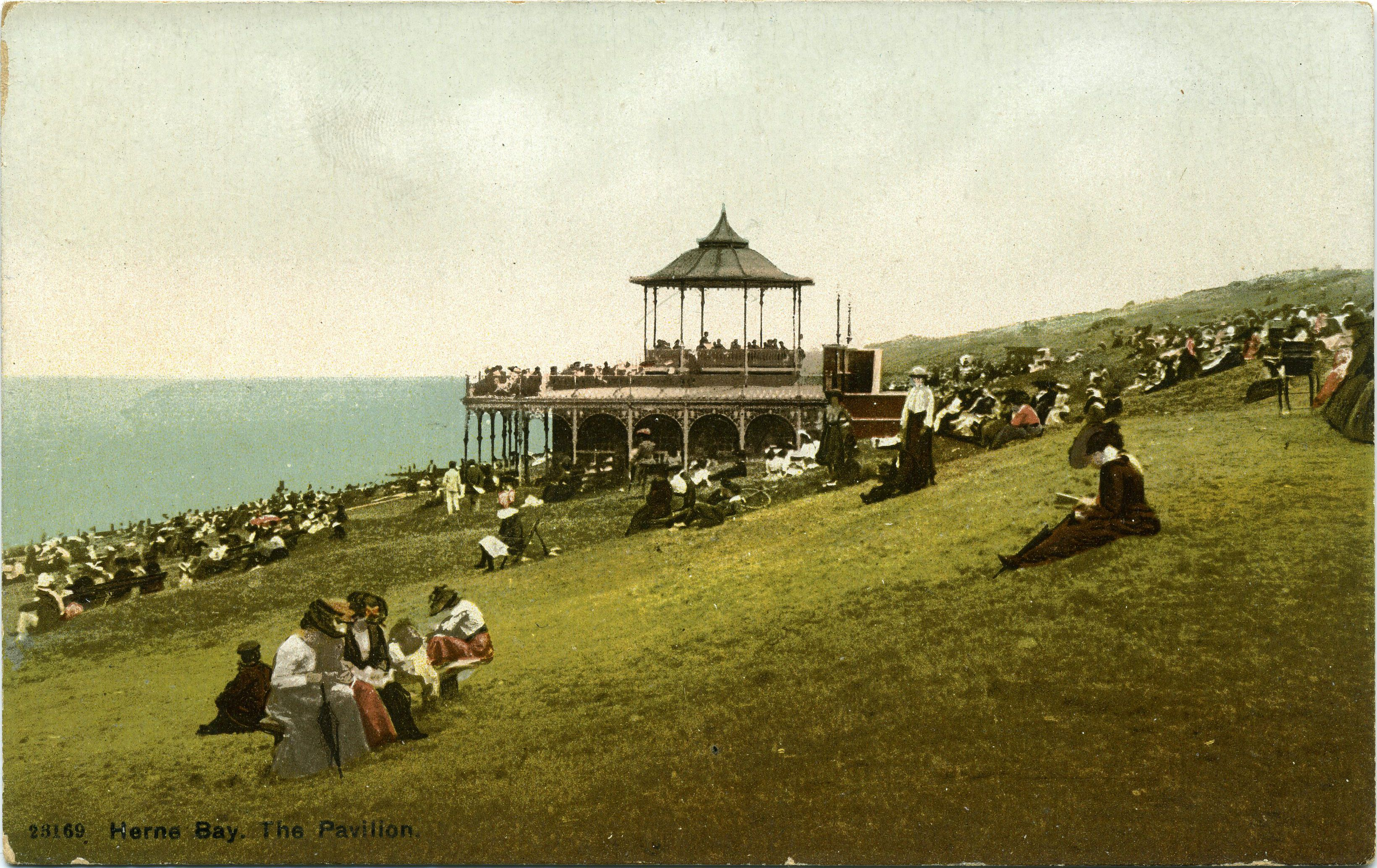
Pavilion on steep slope, 1904–1912

In a speech on opening day, 4 April 1904, the architect F.W.J. Palmer detailed the building's construction. To prevent subsidence on this steep clay slope, so close to the sea:

"6,000 cubic yards (4,600 m^{3}) [of spoil] had to be removed, 12 inches (30 cm) by 12 inches (30 cm) pitch pine piles ranging from 10 feet (3.0 m) to 20 feet (6.1 m) long were driven at stated distances down into the clay, on the north, east and west sides of the site, and connected together by means of 1 inch (2.5 cm) wrought iron tie rods passed through the piles, and interlaced one with the other, and connected together by means of 6 inches (15 cm) by 2.5 inches (6.4 cm) by 1 inch (2.5 cm) iron rings, through which the tie rods were passed, and nuts placed in position, thus enabling the tie rods to be adjusted and tightened to a nicety. The whole of the site was then covered with a solid mass of Portland cement concrete 18 inches (46 cm) thick, which when finished left the ironwork completely embedded in the same. Upon this foundation the superstructure was erected." From a speech by F.W.J. Palmer at the opening of The Pavilion, 4 April 1904

Under all walls there was a damp course of fibrous asphalt. The outer walls were of red and hard stock bricks with dressings of Victoria stone and facing bricks of Whiting's best reds The roof was made of rolled steel joists covered with sheets of expanded steel lathing, supplied and fixed by the New Expanded Metal Company, and the lathing for the ceilings was of sheets of this expanded metal lathing but of a smaller gauge. 5 inches (13 cm) of coke breezed concrete was laid over these sheets, then 1 inch (2.5 cm) of Val de Travers Mastic Asphalt was laid on top in two 0.5 inches (1.3 cm) layers.

=== Completed pavilion 1904 ===
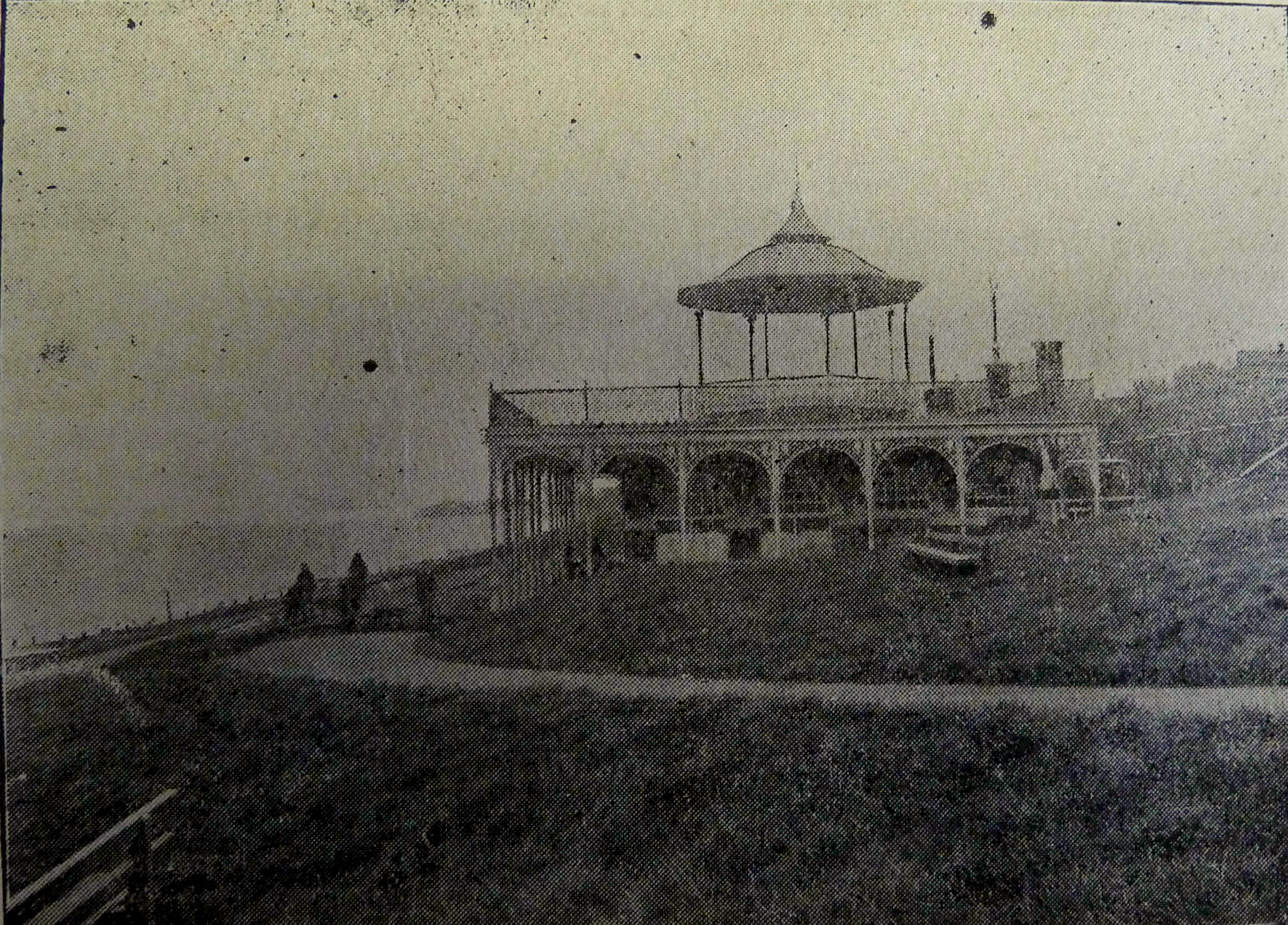
Almost finished, March 1904

This is a red brick building with patent Victoria stone dressings surrounded by a verandah of iron columns. In 1904 all the windows had Venetian blinds, and all the rooms were ventilated by Boyle's fresh air inlet ventilators. There were gas brackets in every room.

It had wide entrance doors: three doors with moulded panels, patent floor springs and brass fingerplates, and swing windows in the top panels. The windows were glazed with 0.25 inches (0.64 cm) British polished plate glass. The window over the doorway had a heron and border painted on cathedral glass. The lobby had moulded corner posts and panelling, and a moulded cornice. Beyond the lobby was a central hall 38 feet (12 m) by 31 feet (9.4 m) by 16 feet (4.9 m) high, with a dado of tinted, glazed bricks. The hall ceiling had a ventilated roof lantern which doubled as the base of the bandstand above. There was 1 inch (2.5 cm) tongue and groove wood flooring laid on 4.5 inches (11 cm) by 3 inches (7.6 cm) joists, and a brown glazed brick skirting, a dado and salmon–coloured walls. Today as in 1904 the ceiling appears panelled, being broken up by girders supporting the roof, and supported by "ornamental iron columns with moulded bases and capitals;" the form of the ceiling lantern remains, but is unventilated. The walls still have the original pilasters with capitals to match the central columns. In 1904 the hall had a 3 feet (0.91 m) high platform stage with moulded panels and corners. Above that was a Victoria stone memorial tablet saying: "This pavilion was presented to the town of Herne Bay by Thomas Dence Esq., 1903. Architect F.W.J. Palmer C.E., surveyor to the Council. Builder A.S. Ingleton, Herne Bay".

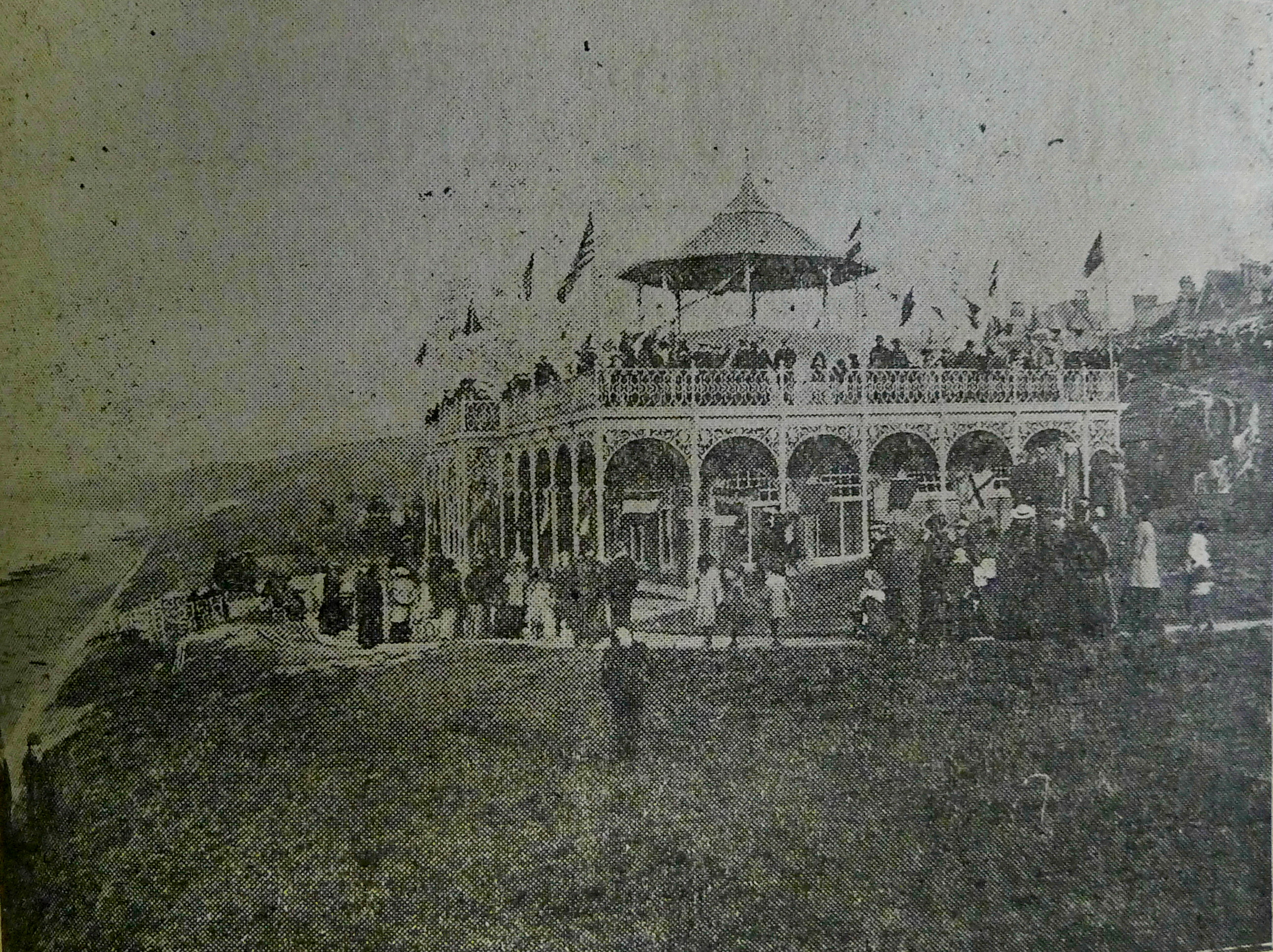
Opening Day, 4 April 1904

On the right or west side of the main hall was a "well-lighted" ladies' retiring room 19 feet (5.8 m) by 19 feet (5.8 m) by 14 feet (4.3 m) high, with tongue and groove flooring and plainer walls than in the main hall. Through a lobby was the ladies' lavatory with six basins and a patent hot-water geyser, plus "every sanitary convenience". On the left or east side of the main hall was the gentlemen's reading room, somewhat larger than the ladies' at 25 feet (7.6 m) by 19 feet (5.8 m) by 14 feet (4.3 m) high. The men's lavatories had a urinal and the "usual offices" supplied by Adam & Co. of London, and a granite-paved floor. Both lavatories had white glazed brick walls to a height of 6 feet (1.8 m) with a "border of one course of tinted moulded bricks, and a skirting of four courses of tinted bricks, the top course of which is moulded." Water came from the Herne Bay Water Company's main in Beacon Hill to a large cistern, and this supplied the handbasins, the nine water closets and the inside and outside urinals. The most "up-to-date" drainage system was provided, but this was the only item not detailed in the newspapers. There were "spacious and comfortable male and female attendants' rooms, with every convenience".

Through a door at the south-west corner of the main hall (now the vestibule) there was a York stone staircase to the roof and road, with 13 inches (33 cm) deep by 6 inches (15 cm) high by 4 feet (1.2 m) wide treads and a wrought iron handrail. The terraced roof, which as of 2013 still exists, was intended for promenade concerts with an audience of 700. It runs over to cover the verandah supported by iron columns and ornamental ironwork supplied by MacFarlane & Co of Glasgow in 1904 and still visible today. The bandstand (demolished 1969) had a "roof supported by slender iron pillars and fenced with elaborately designed ironwork." At the east and west of the building there were Victoria stone drinking fountains (the eastern one was still visible as of 2011). The walls, wood and ironwork were painted with Velure.

=== Opening 1904 ===
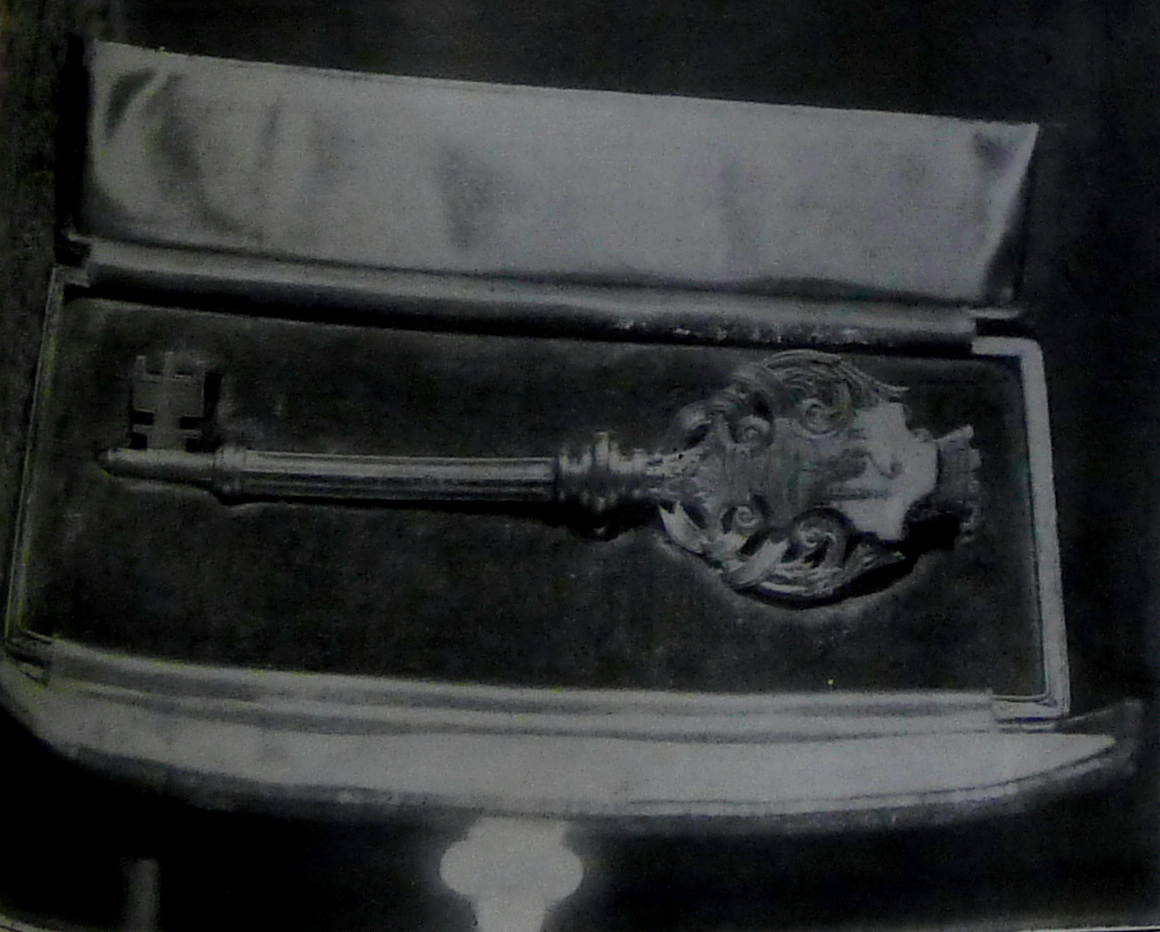
Key presented to Dence by Ingleton, 1904

The Pavilion was opened at 3pm on Easter Monday, 4 April 1904. Thousands of spectators stood outside, and 300 invited persons squeezed into the little hall (now the vestibule). People pressed their faces against the windows or stood in a "dense mass" on East Cliff, and the door was guarded by Mr Boorman the Town Beadle in "sober uniform". The Pavilion was decorated with streamers, and flags including the Union Jack, the French Tricolour and the US Stars and Stripes. The Band of the Corps of the Royal Engineers was conducted by Lieutenant Summer in the bandstand on the roof. Inside the hall, flags were arranged around the walls and over Dence's memorial tablet awaiting the unveiling ceremony. The platform and its table were piled and surrounded with flowers. The band stopped, the audience stood, and the council dignitaries processed onto the platform, headed by chairman of the council G. Farley JP, CC, with Mrs Dence on his arm, and guest of honour Thomas Dence who drew special applause. Proceedings were begun by a child, thus:

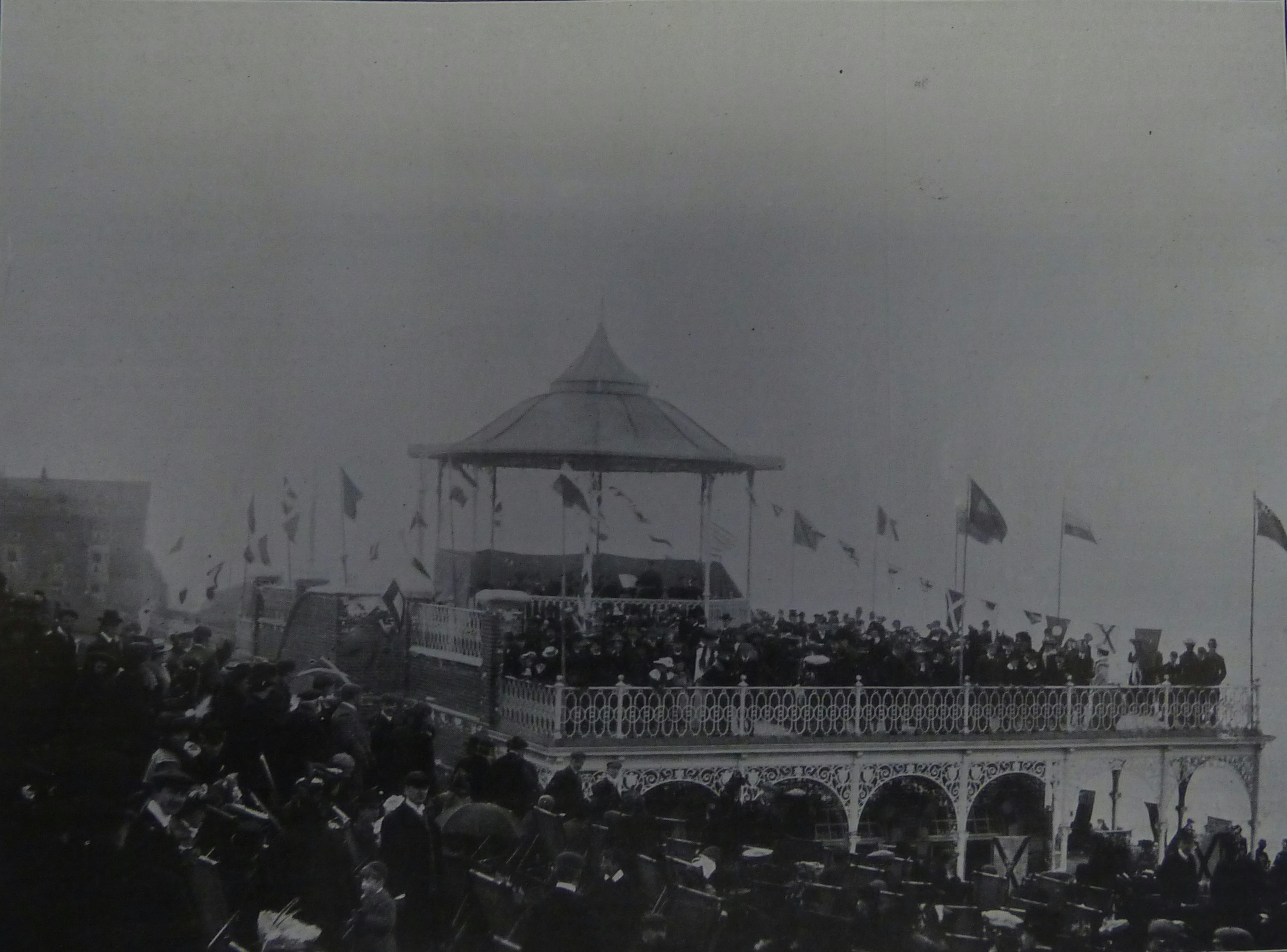
Opening Day 1904 by Fred C. Palmer

"First a pretty little girl dressed in white, with a felt bonnet to match, from which looked out a pair of dark eyes, and brown ringlets strayed upon the shoulders, a very picture of a charming maid of Kent, stepped forward, tripped her way onto the platform and presented Mrs Dence with a beautiful bouquet, which was received with a smile by the lady, and the gift repaid with a kiss; while those present loudly applauded. This was Miss Ida Iggulden, daughter of Councillor P.E. Iggulden, vice–chairman of the Council, who must be proud of her." Anon, Herne Bay Press, 9 Apr 1904

Councillor Farley gave a speech glorifying the Pavilion, the town, and Mr Dence the donor. He said, to applause, that he "hoped all would do their duty in maintaining and preserving it for the purpose for which it had been granted to the town". Mr Ingleton the builder presented a silver-gilt key to Mr Dence. On the front it bore an enamelled plate showing the heron, the clock tower and Reculver. The reverse of the key bore the inscription: "Presented to T. Dence Esq., donor of the East Cliff Pavilion, Herne Bay, by A.S. Ingleton, April 4, 1904." Palmer the architect explained the building's construction (detailed above), then Thomas Dence the donor gave a long and much applauded speech (also detailed above). An unnamed person unveiled the plaque commemorating Dence's gift, and the clerk to the council read and presented an address of thanks, engrossed and illuminated on vellum, to Dence. Various councillors followed that with speeches of mutual thanks and compliments, and the band on the roof ended the ceremony with God Save the King. Refreshments were provided in the gentlemen's reading room for the invited 300, who then joined the crowd on the roof to hear a concert by the Royal Engineers Band.

== King Edward VII Memorial Hall ==
=== Mr A. Hardy the builder ===
Mr A. Hardy of Woking, with his company Hardy & Co., was the contractor for the construction of the second phase of The King's Hall in 1912–1913. The main challenge in this project was the ground work, since a large mass of the cliff had to be removed. The firm had already carried out previous works for the council amounting to £20,000, plus important projects for the councils of Strood, Frimley, Farnham, Woking and Chertsey. Other council works carried out in 1913 were for Kirkby, Portsmouth, Woking and Blean. In 1913 the company accepted a £30,000 contract for Whitstable's town main drainage works complete with house, pumping station and outfall works. In respect of The King's Hall, all the ground-work, ferro-concrete work and decorative work was done under supervision of P. Taylor and G. Breward.

=== Building ===
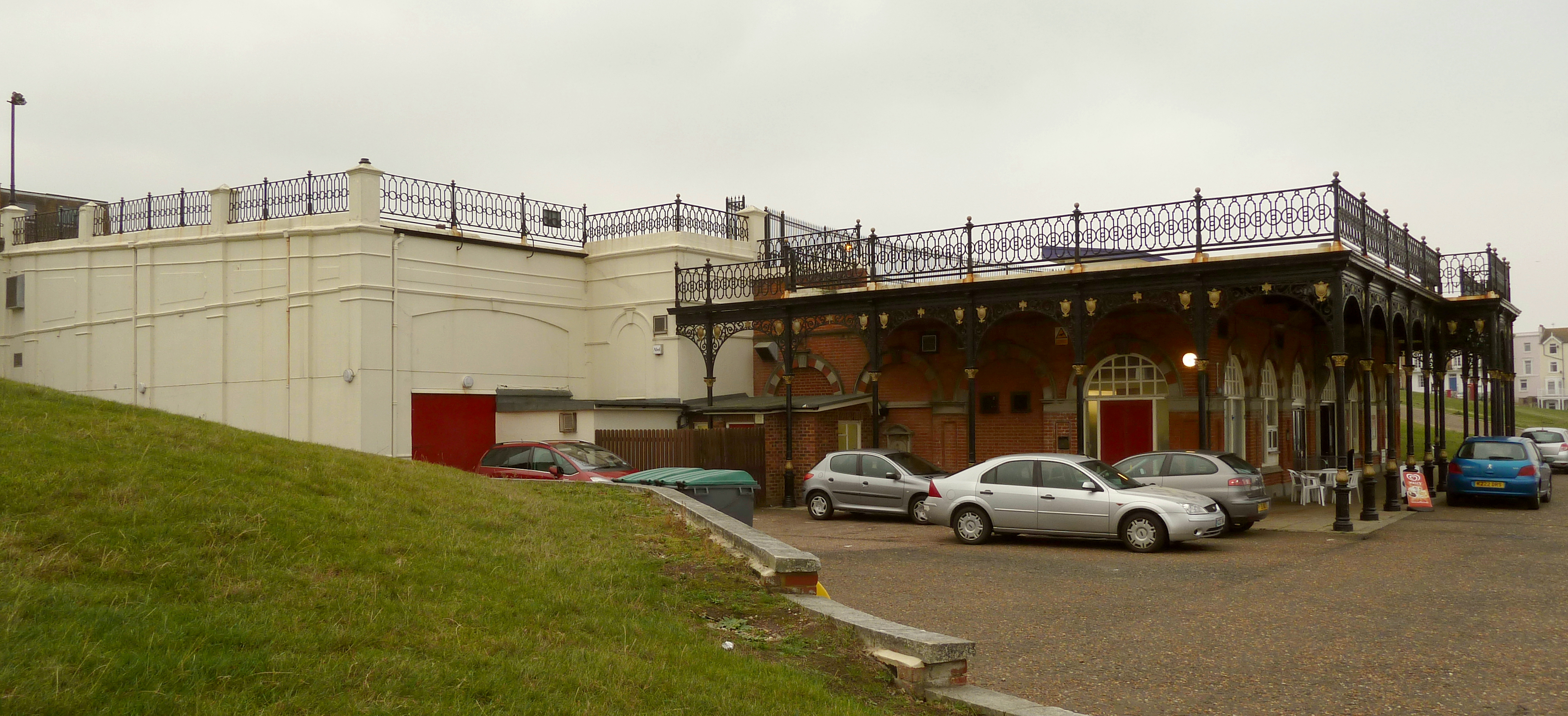
King's Hall 2011

In 1913 the Pavilion was developed as a memorial to the late King Edward VII. The architect was again the council surveyor F.W.J. Palmer who presented his plans in April 1911. The council applied to the Local Government Board (LGB) for a loan, and the work cost £6,000: £5,000 for the excavation and construction; £1,000 for furnishings. £5,956 was received from the LGB in August 1912. The builders were Hardy & Co. of Woking whose tender of £5,578 on 16 September 1912 was accepted for the erection work, and one of the contractors was electricity company Hunt & Sons of Charles Street, Herne Bay, who ran a cable underground from their works, beneath Canterbury Road and through the cliff. The entertainers Rouse, Way & Wilson made an advance investment of £700 in the theatre, the profits to be shared by the council. The excavation commenced in October 1912, and "many thousands of yards of London Clay" were removed to extend the building into the cliff. The 1904 building was incorporated and extended as a theatre, concert hall and dance hall below the Downs on East Cliff, and the existing small auditorium became the vestibule for the new hall. The 1913 Hall was designed to accommodate 1,500, with 1,100 in the open-air theatre on the roof. The high price for this build partly reflects the large excavation into the cliff for the Hall, and the early use of ferro-concrete, with steel bars made by the Spiral Bond Bar Company, who had patented the process that they used in the same year. The building was specially designed not to interfere with the view from houses on Beacon Hill to the south; nevertheless a 60 feet (18 m) flagstaff was erected between the Hall and the Beacon Hill estate.

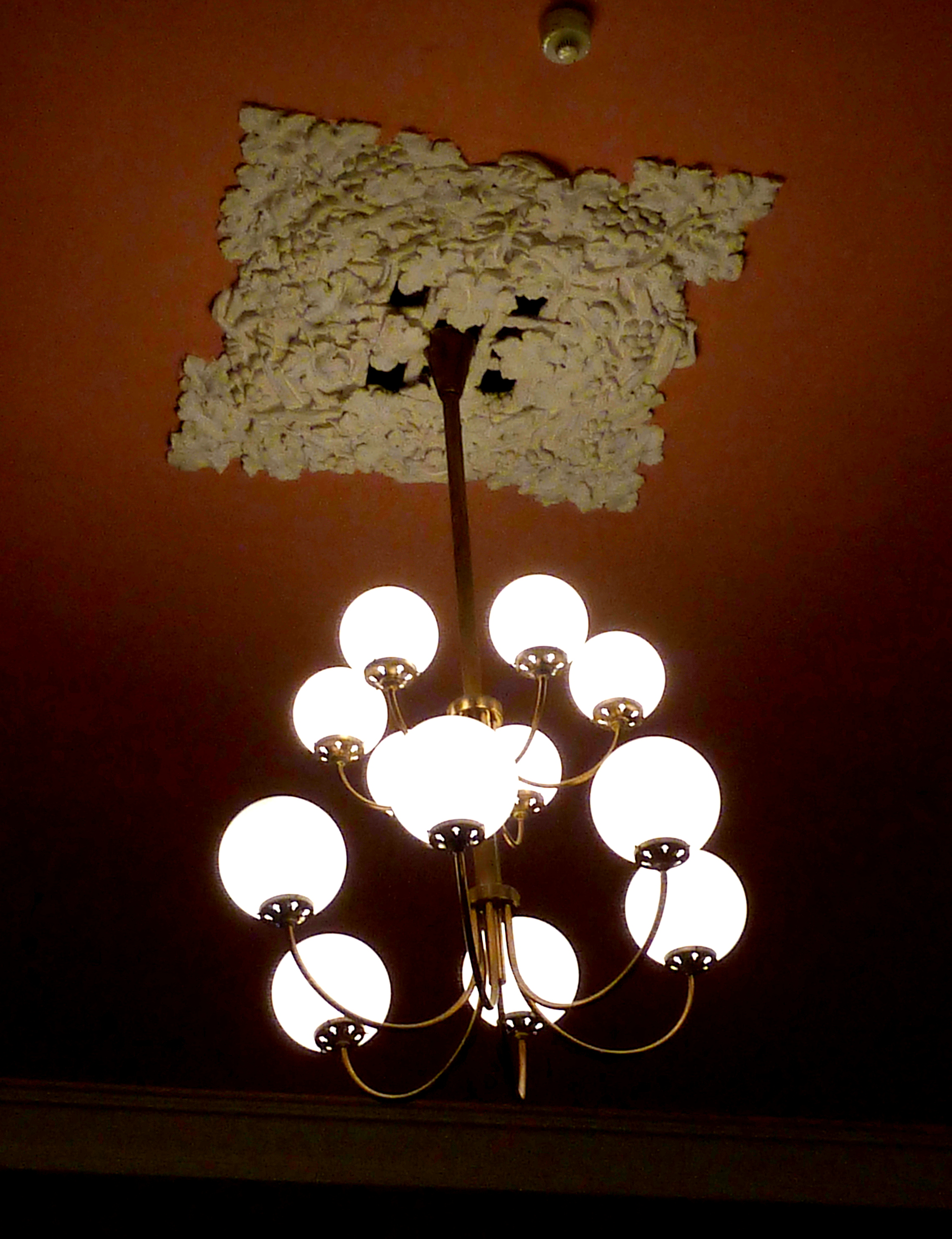
Ceiling rose ventilator, 2011

At a size of 136 feet (41 m) long, 60 feet (18 m) wide and 20 feet (6.1 m) high, the Hall provided space for seating 1,500. In 1913 the ceiling was plastered with a cornice and a "deep frieze of a delicate tint, and a picture moulding" around three sides of the Hall; this has now been replaced. The four main reinforced concrete roof beams create five ceiling bays, and in each bay are three plaster centrepieces representing vines and grapes. These are ventilator-covers. The middle one of each three originally carried copper bronze electroliers with chains and Holophane reflectors. (Today, more numerous and bigger lights are fixed there.) The walls were originally largely of glass and painted in eau de nil or pale green, with a darker shade on the dado. The special dance floor was rock maple over concrete, and the acoustics were said to be "perfect". There was a further tiered seating area on the roof for 1,100 deckchairs facing the cast iron bandstand and linking the roof with the Downs. The roof was "illuminated by five electric light standards, and the columns, the upper ornamental part of the bandstand, and the ribs of the bandstand roof [were] picked out with fairylights." The box office in the vestibule was "artistically designed . . . of brick faced with plaster in the Georgian style." The marble plaque on its front was carved by Emil Fuchs who had designed the King Edward VII Coronation Medal. The old tongue-and-groove wood flooring of the vestibule was now replaced with terrazzo paving, with the town crest decorating the area in front of the kiosk (today this is covered over, or possibly removed). Over the Hall's exit doors (now removed) and over the kiosk were bullseye glass circles.

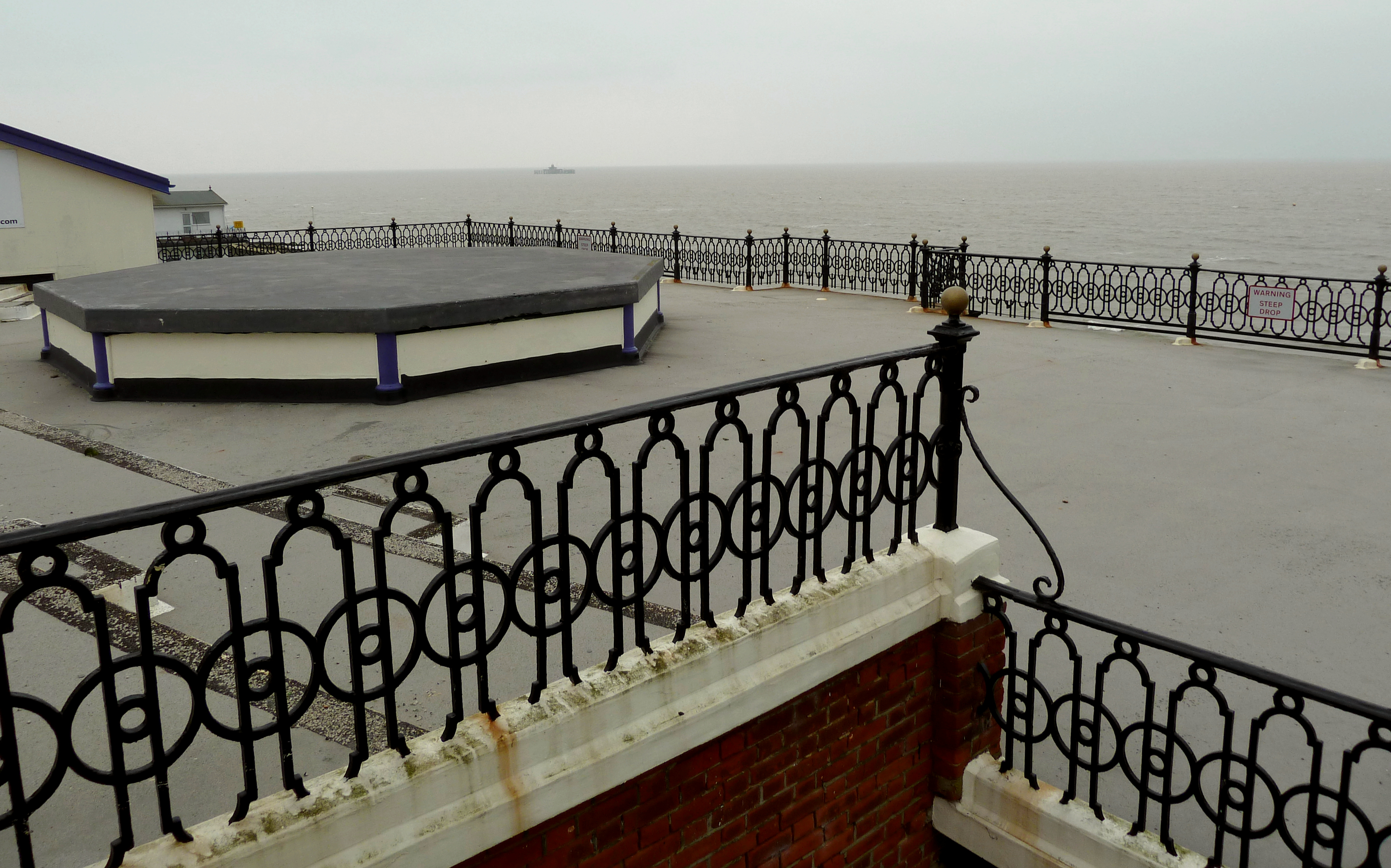
The roof without bandstand, 2011

The original 1913 stage incorporated a faux cottage standing on an apron platform against the south wall of the Hall. After Herne Bay's two other theatres were burned down in the 1920s, The King's hall consequently had to take on all the large concerts. The little cottage stage was seen to be inadequate, and a large stage with proscenium arch was built at the east end of the room. The faux cottage and apron were eventually dismantled. With the old "cottage" stage against the south wall and the four large concrete ceiling-beams running north–south, the acoustics had been considered perfect. However the positioning of the new stage against the east wall caused some of the soundwaves to be blocked or diverted by the same beams which now crossed their path, so that the audience never again experienced satisfactory acoustics. However the Hall's original maple dance floor was "considered by some to be one of the best in Kent". The original seating of the Hall consisted of several rows of tip-up chairs in green plush, and the remaining chairs were of fumed oak.

=== Opening 1913 ===
==== Preparations ====
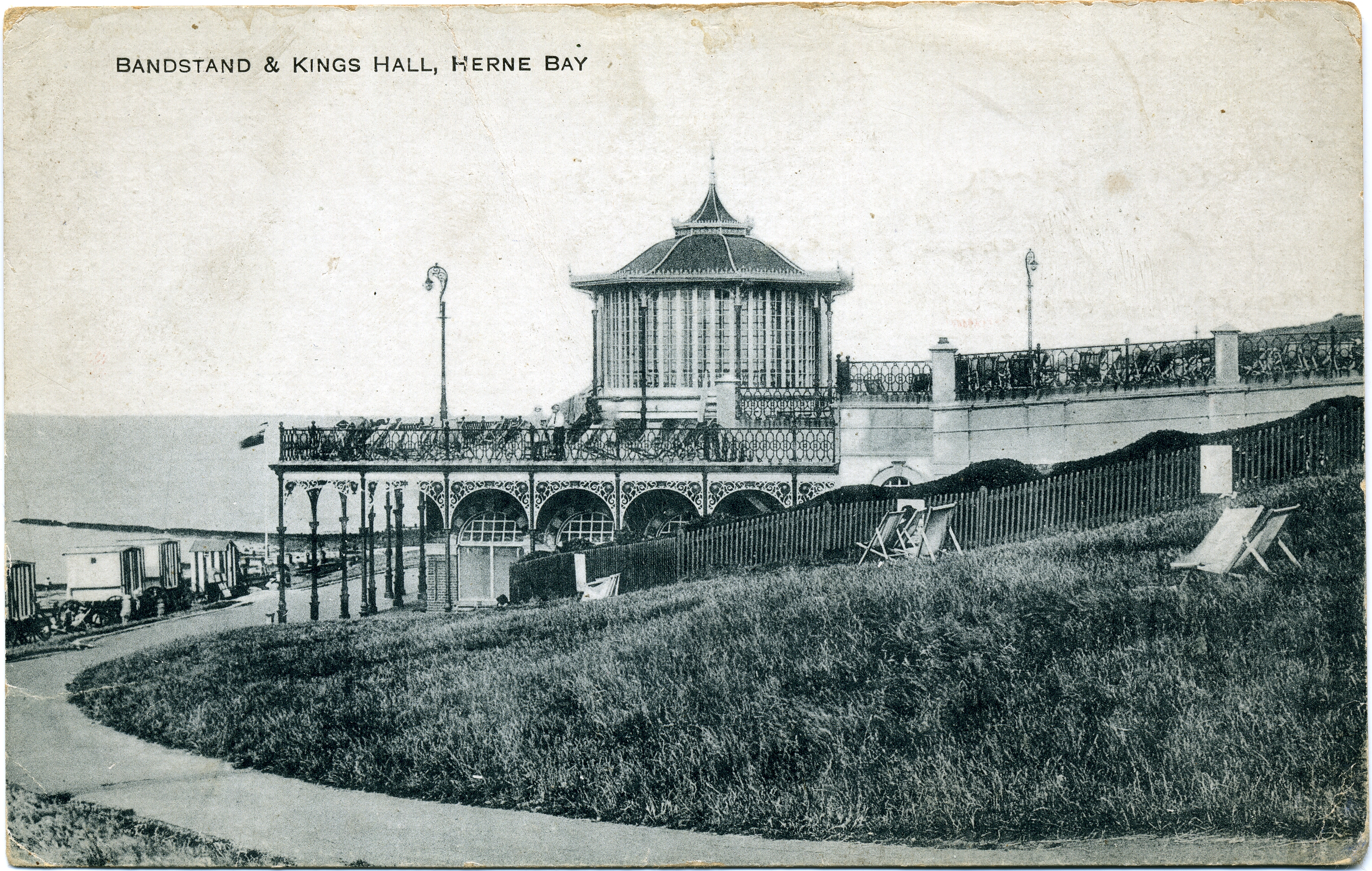
King's Hall 1913–1914

Queen Alexandra, the king's widow, agreed that the building should be renamed "The King Edward VII Memorial Hall". The previous 1904 opening had been a comparatively small affair because no VIP guest could be permitted to overshadow the donor, Mr Dence. However, because the 1913 phase was built on a government loan and there was no donor to thank, this Opening Day could a big event, involving the late king's sister and the whole town. It took five sizeable committees to organise everything: the General Committee which included the Funds Committee, the Luncheon and Reception Committee, the Decorations Committee (including the builder and architect of the Hall), the Publicity Committee and the Children's Committee (including local priests and teachers). The Hall was opened on 10 July 1913 by Princess Beatrice, sister of the late king, then titled Princess Henry of Battenburg. All public premises, private business and private houses along the route were decorated:

There was a series of triumphal arches at various points along the route, and a series of Venetian masts, entwined with various coloured cloth with evergreen at the base. From the tops of these, streamers of flags crossed the streets, and the effect altogether was very pleasing. The most notable arches were those outside the Town Hall and on the East Cliff at the north end of Beacon Road; while those at the corner of Station Road and High Street, at the corner of William Street and Mortimer Street attracted a great deal of attention. These were Venetian masts, and on the red bunting forming the cross pieces were appropriate mottoes in white lettering. The Fire Brigade arch on the sea front formed of the two escapes, with the steam and manual engines at the base, and ornamented with the hose, jets and flags and canvas buckets was much admired. When the Princess passed the members of the Fire Brigade stood on the escapes.

The Princess had made a special request for local children to be involved in the ceremony. The schoolchildren of Herne Bay, Herne and Reculver, aged five to fourteen years, were assembled at their council schools at two o'clock where they were each presented with a flag and a souvenir bronze medallion. The front of the medallion bore a representation of the medallion plaque of Edward VII in the Hall. The obverse said, "King Edward VII Memorial Hall, Herne Bay. Formally opened by Her Royal Highness Princess Henry of Battenburg, Thursday July 10th AD 1913." The medal had a red, white and blue ribbon designed to be worn around the neck. Carrying flags and accompanied by their teachers, the Girl Guides and the 1st Herne Bay Troop of Boy Scouts with their bugle band, they marched to the Downs where in due course they were presented to the Princess.

==== Reception at railway station ====
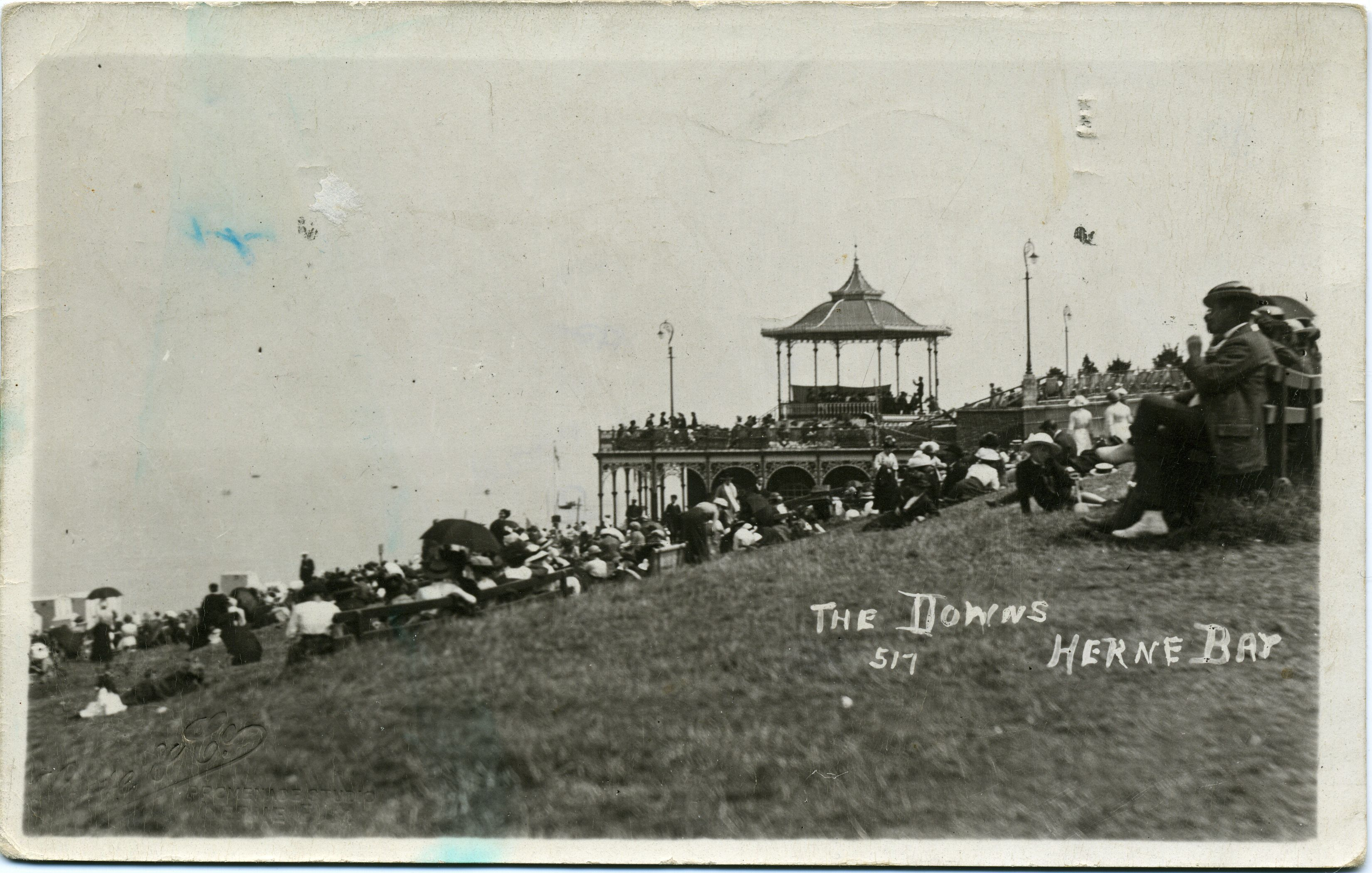
King's Hall, 1927

Princess Henry's royal train of five carriages left Victoria at 10.45 am, and steamed in to Herne Bay at 12.26 pm, with her saloon carriage stopping exactly at the red carpet, to be met by an escort of soldiers presenting arms and Fusiliers playing the National Anthem. The Princess wore a grey brocade dress, with a cuirass bodice of a darker shade with gold embroidery. Her cloak was entirely of grey beads and ornamented with black silk braid, and she had on a black hat with stone-grey lancet plume feathers. Mr Knollys in the "magnificent uniform of the City of London Yeomanry" presented Sir Mark Edlmann Collet, High Sheriff of Kent, "who was attended by two footmen in gorgeous livery and bearing silver-tipped wands." The High Sheriff in turn presented various council, ecclesiastical and mayoral personages to the Princess, and she was given a bouquet. Gathering at the station to meet the Princess at the station were "territorials in scarlet and buff and the New College Cadet Corps in more sober khaki with bayonets fixed," along with 4th Company F Battalion The Buffs, East Kent Regiment "in their scarlet and buff uniforms." They were joined by a squadron of mounted 6th Dragoon Guards who were to provide the guard of honour and travelling escort "with glistening helmets and tossing plumes and flashing swords." Taking centre ground to provide the music was the Band of the Second Battalion of the Royal Dublin Fusiliers "in full dress with their busbies". The station was "decorated with flags and a covered way laid with red carpet had been prepared from the gateway on the right of the booking office. All round were flags, which had plenty of life in the fresh, southerly breeze."

==== Processions ====
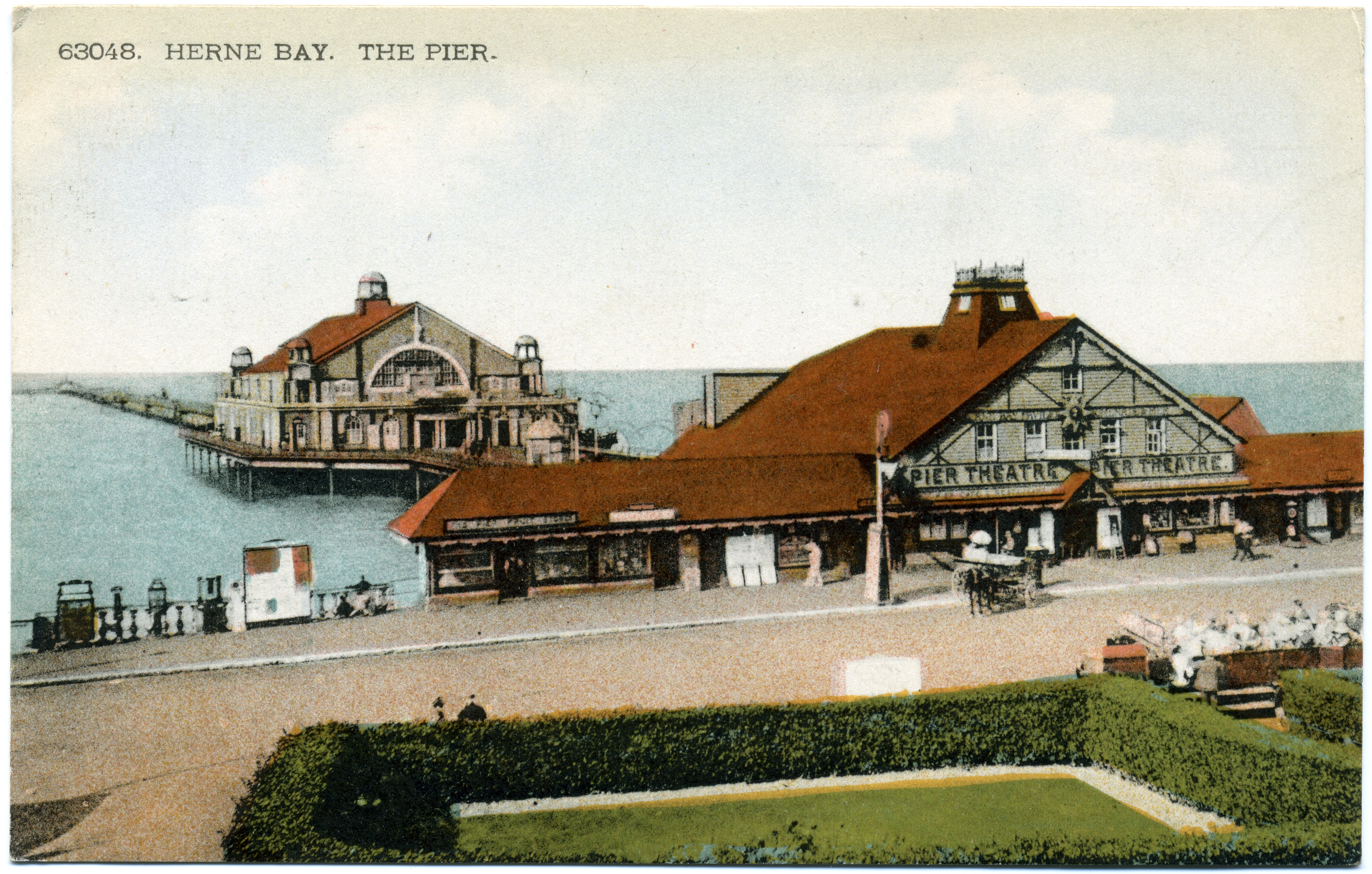
Pier entrance and Grand Pavilion, 1910–1928

The first of two processions from the station to the Hall included five carriages full of above-mentioned VIPs and the Princess, the military escort and band, and a lot more soldiers; this procession made a carnival-like circuit of Herne Bay. The second procession, which went straight to the Hall, consisted of sixteen more carriages. The first of the sixteen contained Reception Committee members including council personages and a judge. The second contained local vicars. The third to twelfth carriages carried councillors and their wives; the twelfth included council surveyor JWS Palmer and his wife. The thirteenth and fourteenth carriages contained mayors and mayoresses of Ramsgate, Margate, Faversham and Canterbury. In the fifteenth carriage was the Chief Constable of Kent, and in the sixteenth were the chairman and clerk to the council with their wives.

The Princess's route to the Hall was designed so that Herne Bay was viewed by her to advantage, and so that the public had a good view of her and her escort. Her procession was cheered by crowds all the way. She travelled via Station Road, High Street, New Street, Victoria Park and The Avenue to the Cottage Hospital where she was given a tour, where the staff including Tom Armstrong Bowes were presented to her, and where she inspected Navy and Army veterans. Back in her carriage, she then processed along Canterbury Road, Mortimer Street, William Street and the sea front, where the Pier entrance was decorated with flags and flowers. At the square by the Pier, Herne Bay Fire Brigade formed a fire escape arch "with the men in position on their ladders, their helmets in the brilliant sunshine glistening like gold against a sky of Italian blue." At the Pier Pavilion the 6th Dragoons played music including H.M.S. Pinafore while she and members of the council enjoyed a French menu at a lunch prepared by a Kensington caterer, the only potentially local source for ingredients being Pate de Pigeon. A local quartet sang the Grace, followed by toasts and long speeches. They all then circled via the sea front, Canterbury Road, Beltinge Road, Sea View Road, Beacon Hill Parade and Beacon Hill back to the East Cliff for the opening ceremony at 2.50pm. During the procession the National Anthem was played at least eight times: twice at the railway station; twice at the hospital; twice at the Pier and twice at the Hall.

==== Public ceremony ====
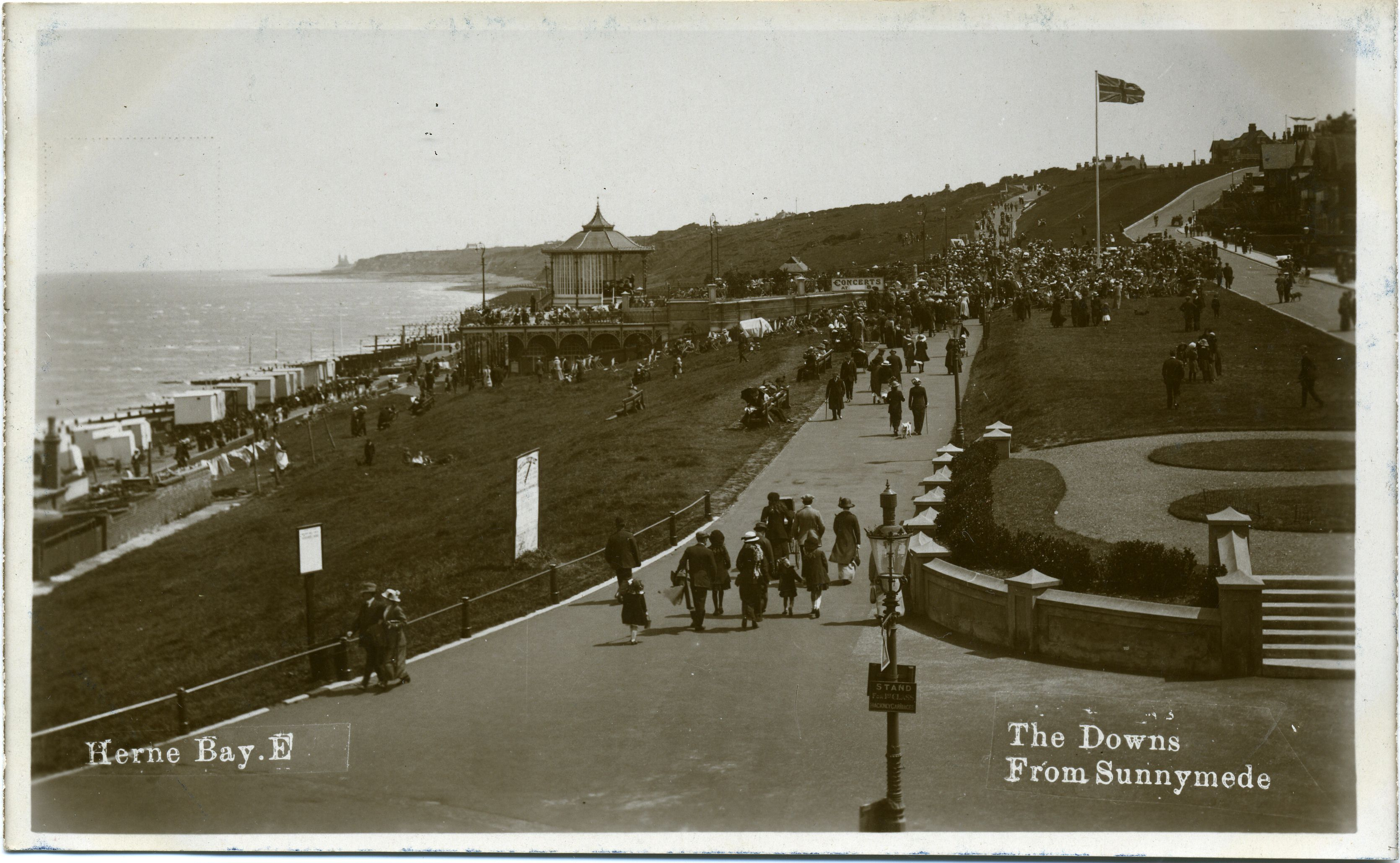
Kings Hall, 1920s

By the time the Princess arrived at the Hall, the roadside crowds had gathered at the site, where the Fusiliers were playing in the bandstand, the 6th Dragoon guard of honour was marshalled at the south-east corner, and all the local schoolchildren were lined up on the north side, including New College cadets, Herne Bay College cadets from St George's Terrace, the Scouts and Guides, and the council scholars in red, white and blue caps and waving flags. On the east and west sides of the building were beflagged grandstands full of members of the public, and there was a dais for the Princess and VIPs on the north side. As the Princess arrived, the National Anthem was played yet again, then the children sang it unaccompanied (following much rehearsal). On display were uniformed Scouts and Guides, members of the National Reserve, Army and Navy veterans wearing their medals and "Friendly Society men in their distinctive regalia" There were speeches by various dignitaries. The enrobed clerk of the council read and presented a crested and illuminated address, inscribed on vellum and scrolled on an ivory roller, to the Princess. The address was presented in a ferro-concrete casket to match the fabric of the Hall's 1913 build:

The casket was rectangular in form, embellished with wrought, silver framing, surmounted by chiselled silver ornaments. On the front of the casket, in a panel of wrought silver, appeared the arms of Her Royal Highness; while on the reverse side were the arms of the Herne Bay Urban District Council. The whole was surmounted by a silver crown. On the front of the sloping lid was a silver plate inscribed, Presented by the town of Herne Bay, July 10th, AD 1913. The interior was lined with silver-grey velvet. Anon, Herne Bay Press 12 July 1913

The Bishop of Dover, attended by the vicars of Herne Bay and Herne, "all in full canonicals," led prayers.

==== Vestibule ceremony ====
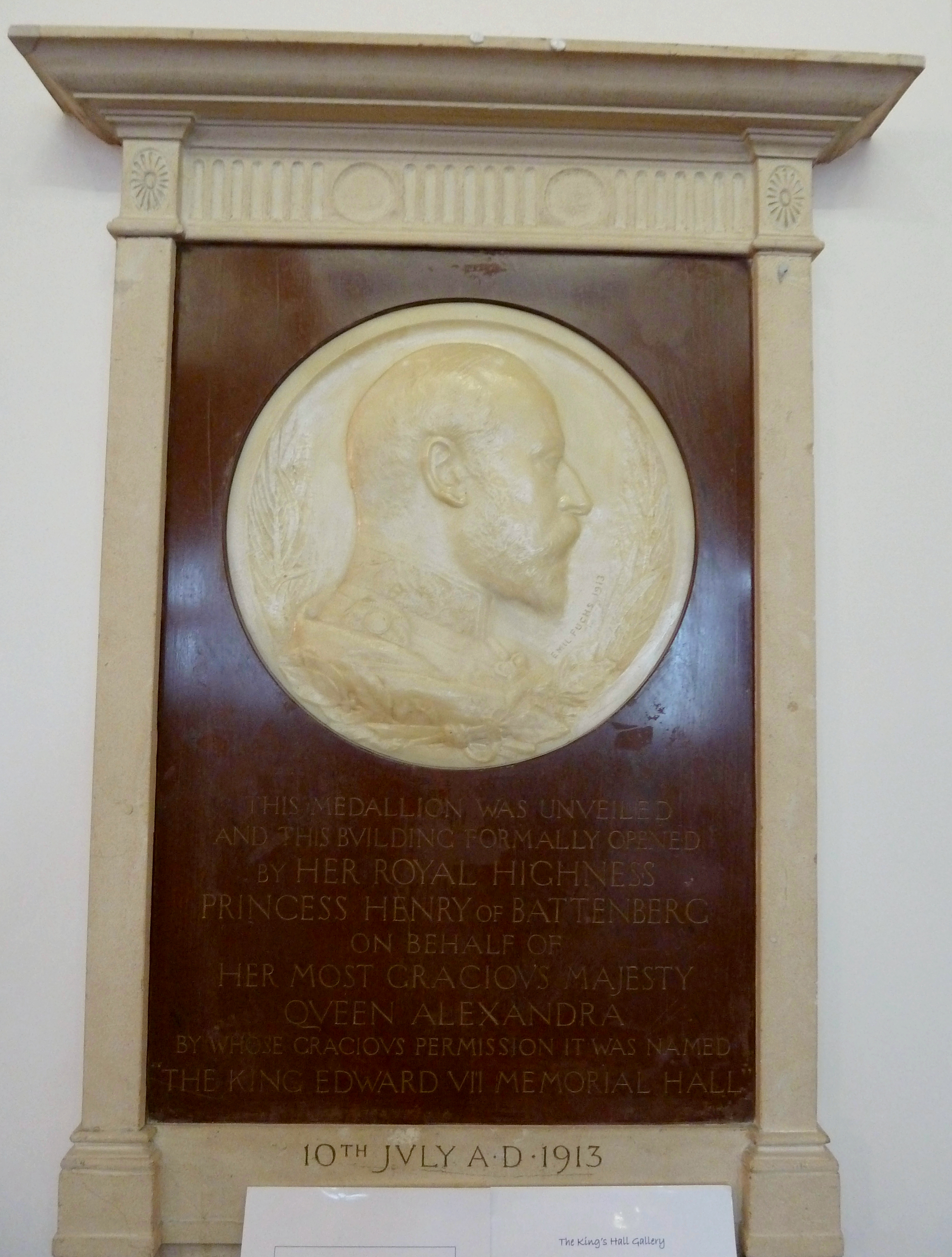
The Fuchs medallion, 2011

The Princess unveiled the medallion plaque of Edward VII in the vestibule. Carved by Emil Fuchs, it was described as a "most lifelike portrait of the late king." The medallion itself was carved from Carrara marble and fixed to a framed panel of reddish-brown and white-veined rosso antico marble. The frame was described as being "of a fine white free stone of a classical design." The inscription on the panel said: "This medallion was unveiled, and this building formally opened, by Her Royal Highness Princess Henry of Battenburg on behalf of Her Most Gracious Majesty Queen Alexandra by whose gracious permission it was named The King Edward VII Memorial Hall, July 10th 1913." F.W.J. Palmer presented her with a gold key; she opened a door to the Hall and declared it open. After the ceremony the schoolchildren were marched back to their schools where they enjoyed a free tea and a sports day.

The Princess and invited audience then listened to a grand concert in the very full Hall. The princess was cheered all the way back to the railway station, was presented with a gold replica of the Fuchs medallion and a keepsake by the chairman of the council, and left on the 4.30 pm train. For the locals during the rest of the day there was dancing in the Grand Pier Pavilion and various concerts including one by the mounted band of the 6th Dragoon Guards. Herne Bay photographer Fred C. Palmer was commissioned to provide postcards of the event, and his photographs were used in the local newspaper, the Herne Bay Press.

== King's Hall ==
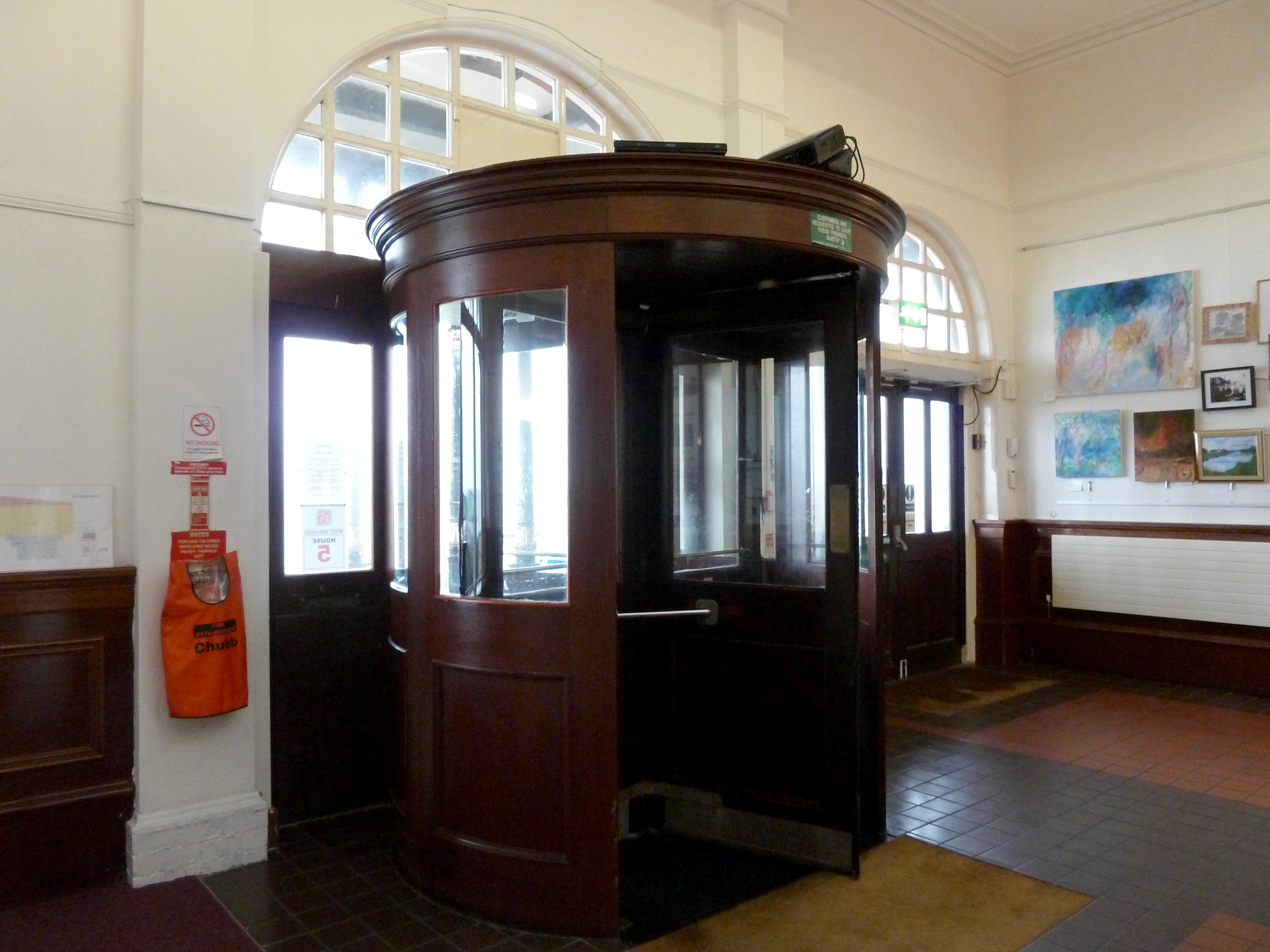
Entrance, 2011

By 1912, even before the ground-breaking in October of that year, the building was already being referred to as The King's Hall. Until the 1920s there were three theatres in the centre of the town: the Town Hall, the Theatre on the Pier (built 1884) and The King's Hall. However, in the 1920s the Town Hall and Pier Theatre burned down, leaving The King's Hall as Herne Bay's sole theatre. The original 1904 cast iron bandstand on the roof was demolished in 1969 due to neglect and deterioration. Traditional military and concert bands had lost their popularity when music fashions changed after World War II.

In 1980, the council threatened to close the Hall to save money; this prompted Herne Bay's twelve council representatives to attempt to save the situation. In 1988 there was a move brought by Councillor Bill Brade and backed by the British Film Institute and police to show films at the Hall because the local Cannon Cinema had been closed and to distract local youth from vandalism. In 1991 staff from the Windsor Cinema in Broadstairs brought portable equipment and seating for converting the Hall into a cinema for three evenings per week plus a children's matinee. In 1993 there was a move to manage the Hall via a local trust composed of the building's user groups, including Herne Bay Operatic Society, Theatrecraft, Herne Bay Active Retirement Association and 691 Promotions. From 1996 to 2004 the Hall was run by Eurest, but the business reverted to council control for a three-year trial from March 2004 after the contractor served up frozen roast potatoes at a dinner dance in November 2002. The council's manager from 2004 to 2006 was Tony Farrow who put in a new £20,000 sound system. In 2006 the council raised hire charges for the Hall from £750 to £1,450 per day, pricing out one of its regular entertainers, Stars in the Afternoon.

=== Repairs and improvements ===
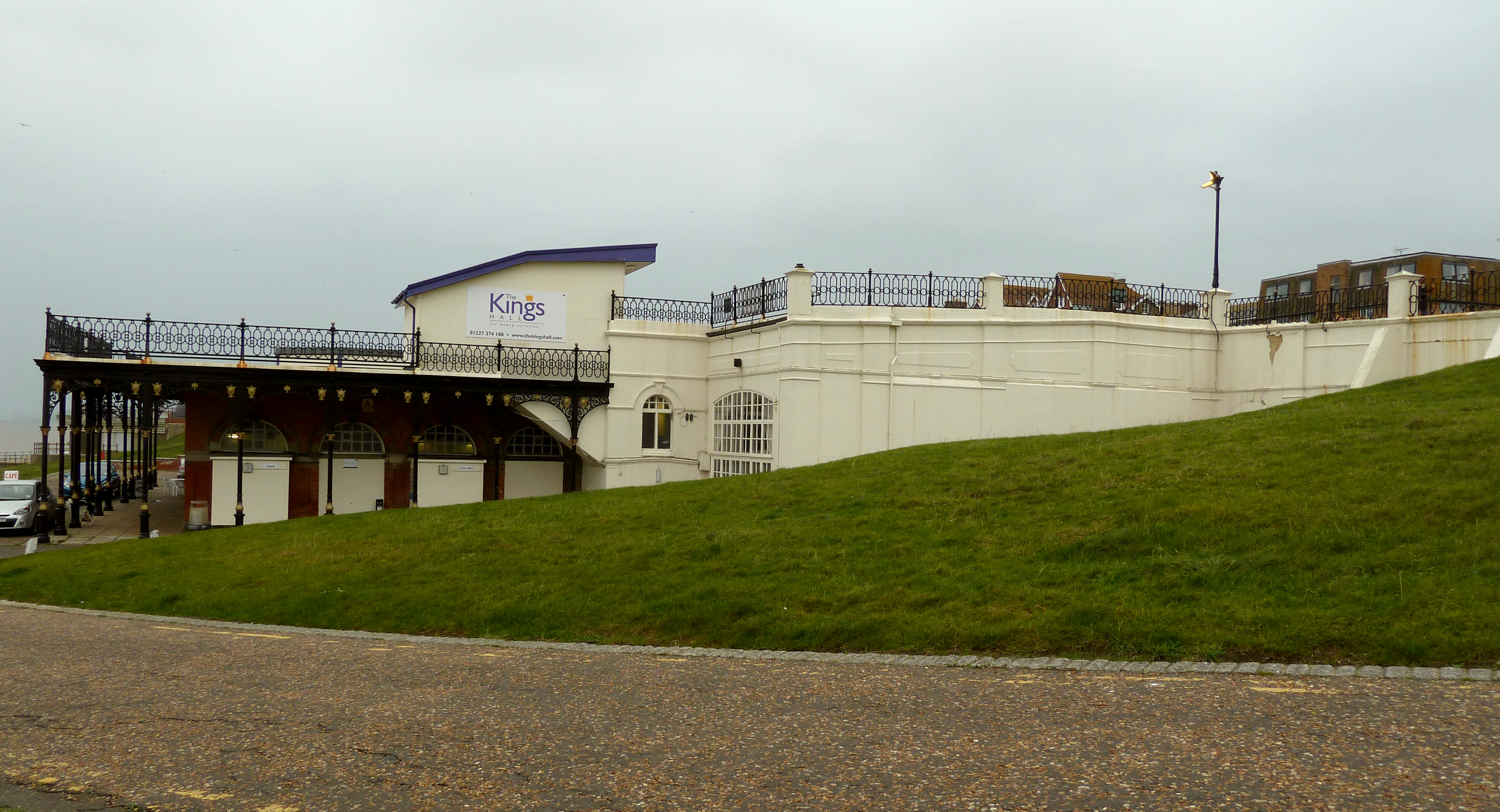
Hall viewed from new access road, 2011

The building underwent anti-corrosion treatment in 2009. In October 2000 an arson attack, attended by 50 firemen and 8 appliances, caused smoke damage and a two-month closure of the Hall for repairs and redecoration. Pending functions including the East Kent Federation of Townswomen's Guilds pageant had to be rearranged. In March 1991 The council agreed to build a new £98,000 access road on the west side of the Hall, leading from Beacon Road; the cost was to include converting the cliff-top road to a promenade. In October 2001 the new access road to the Hall was being constructed.

=== Entertainments and events ===
==== Before World War II ====
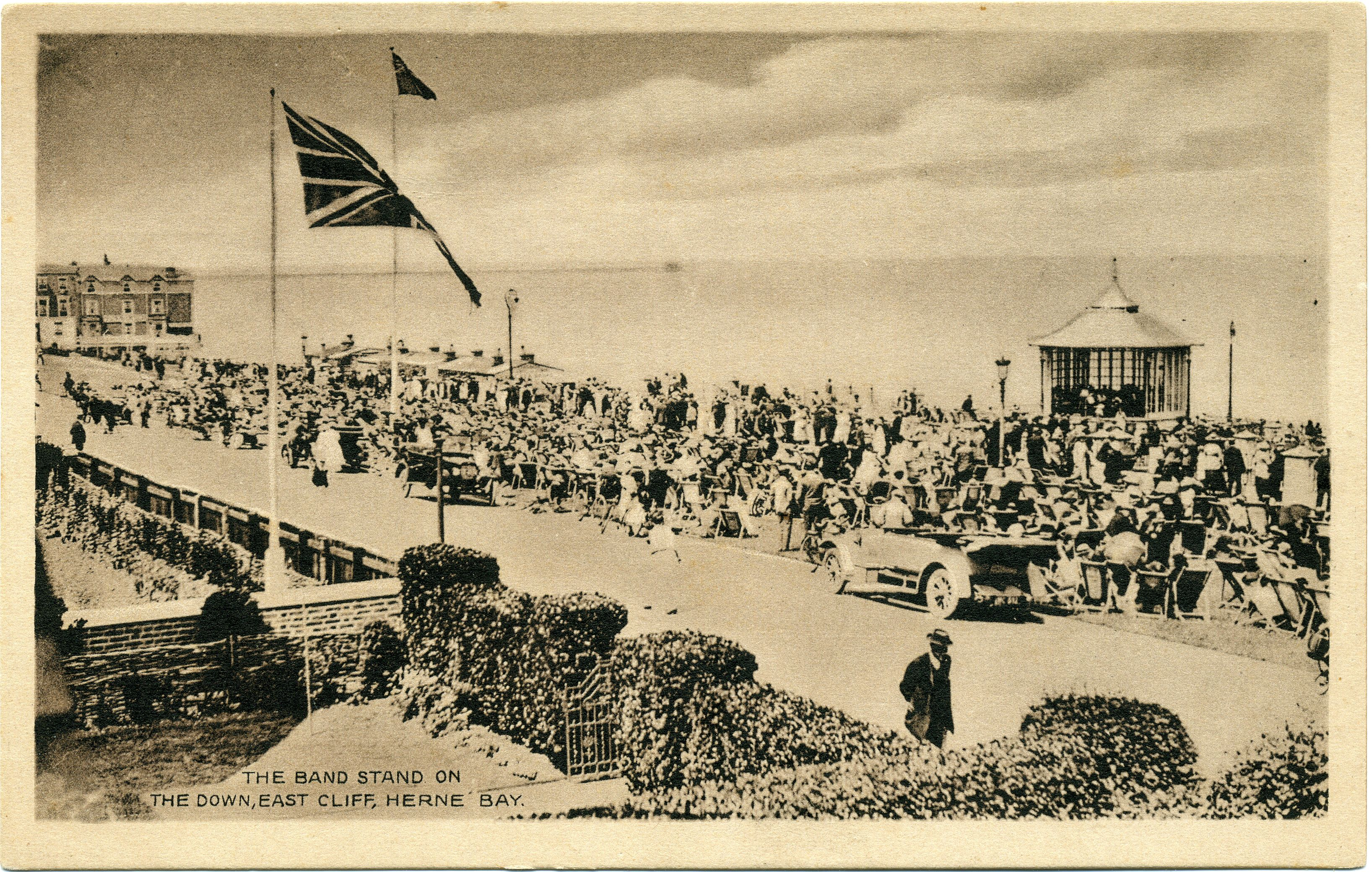
Band performing 1904–1912

During the summer of 1904, the band of the Corps of the Royal Engineers performed in the bandstand. From 1904 to the 1950s, during the summer season there was a different repertory theatre show, concert party or Pierrot show every week. A regular repertory company was Harry Hanson's Court Players. Throughout the year there were regular dances to bands led by, for example, Ted Heath, Syd Lawrence and Eric Delaney. The Wylie Price orchestra, the regular tea dance band at the Central Bandstand, usually performed at the town's new year party in the Hall. The yearly selection dance for Miss Herne Bay, the carnival queen, always took place here, and as of 2005 was continuing to do so. In 1927 Herne Bay hosted eleven different bands including the Buffs. Guest bands performed at The King's Hall bandstand in the morning, then at the Central Bandstand in the afternoon or evening. At the end of the day, the East Kent Bus Company provided a fleet of double-decker buses to transport the audience home to Whitstable and Canterbury.

==== After World War II ====
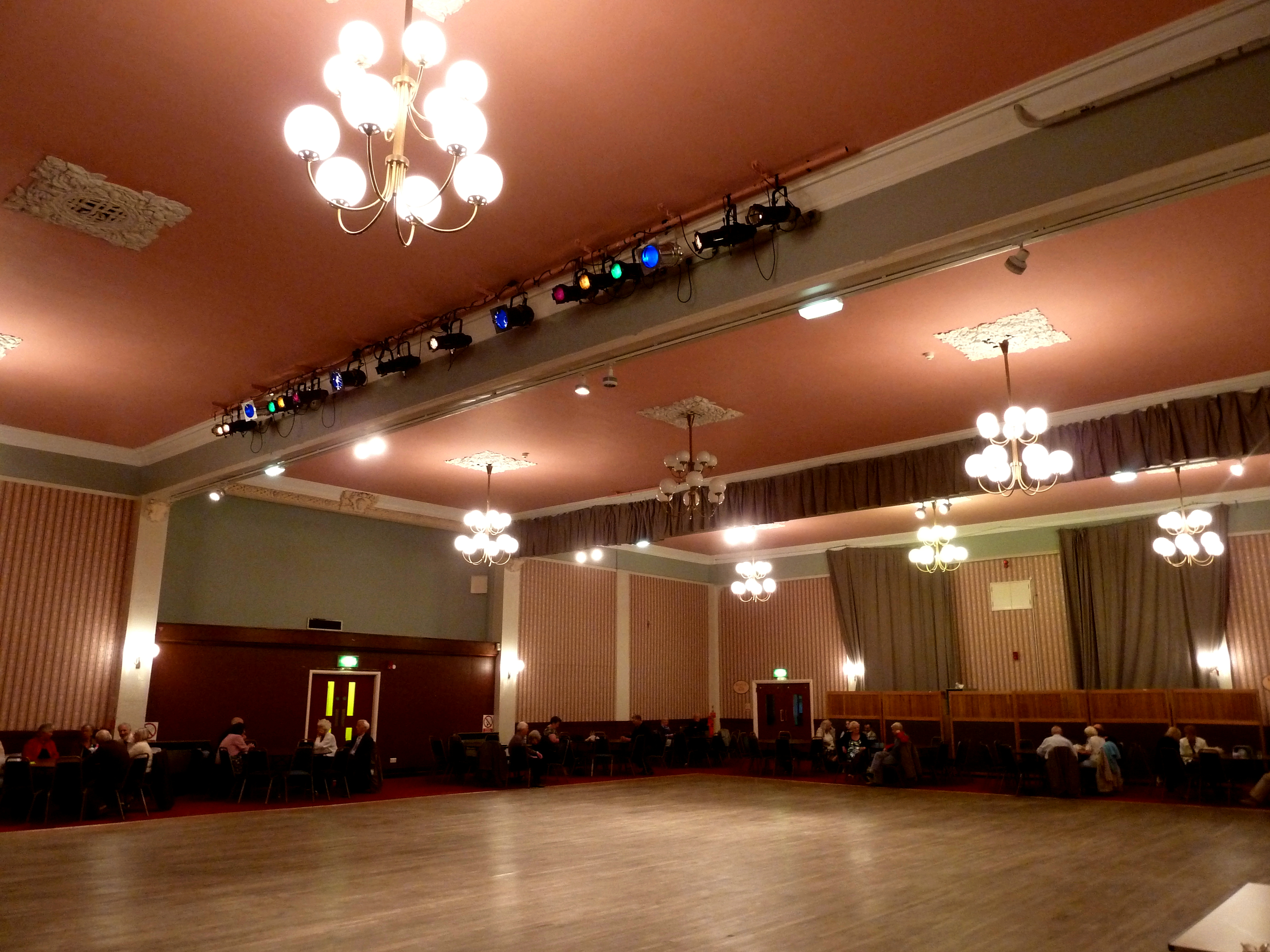
Dance floor, 2011

Amateur dramatics groups such as Herne Bay Operatic Society (started 1951) and Theatrecraft (started 1948) have always used the Hall and as of 2013 continued to do so. Professional wrestling took place here in the 1970s. In 1978, Opera For All presented a small-scale, costumed performance of La Traviata by young, professional singers accompanied by a single piano. In 1987 the Sittingbourne DJ Steve Barker organised several under-18 celebrity discos, featuring Bradley Sheppard and Lee MacDonald. In 1988 Jupiter Brass gave a concert at Herne Bay Music Club's 10th birthday. In April 1989 The Soviet National Folk Dance Ensemble of twenty dancers and nine musicians, on their first visit outside Soviet Russia, stayed with families locally and performed at the Hall. The Hall hosted a keyboard and organ festival in aid of charity in 1989. In April, May and June 1999, 691 Promotions operated monthly raves with police approval from 11.45pm until 7.45am. At a previous rave held at the Hall in March 1999, there were three arrests.

==== 21st century ====
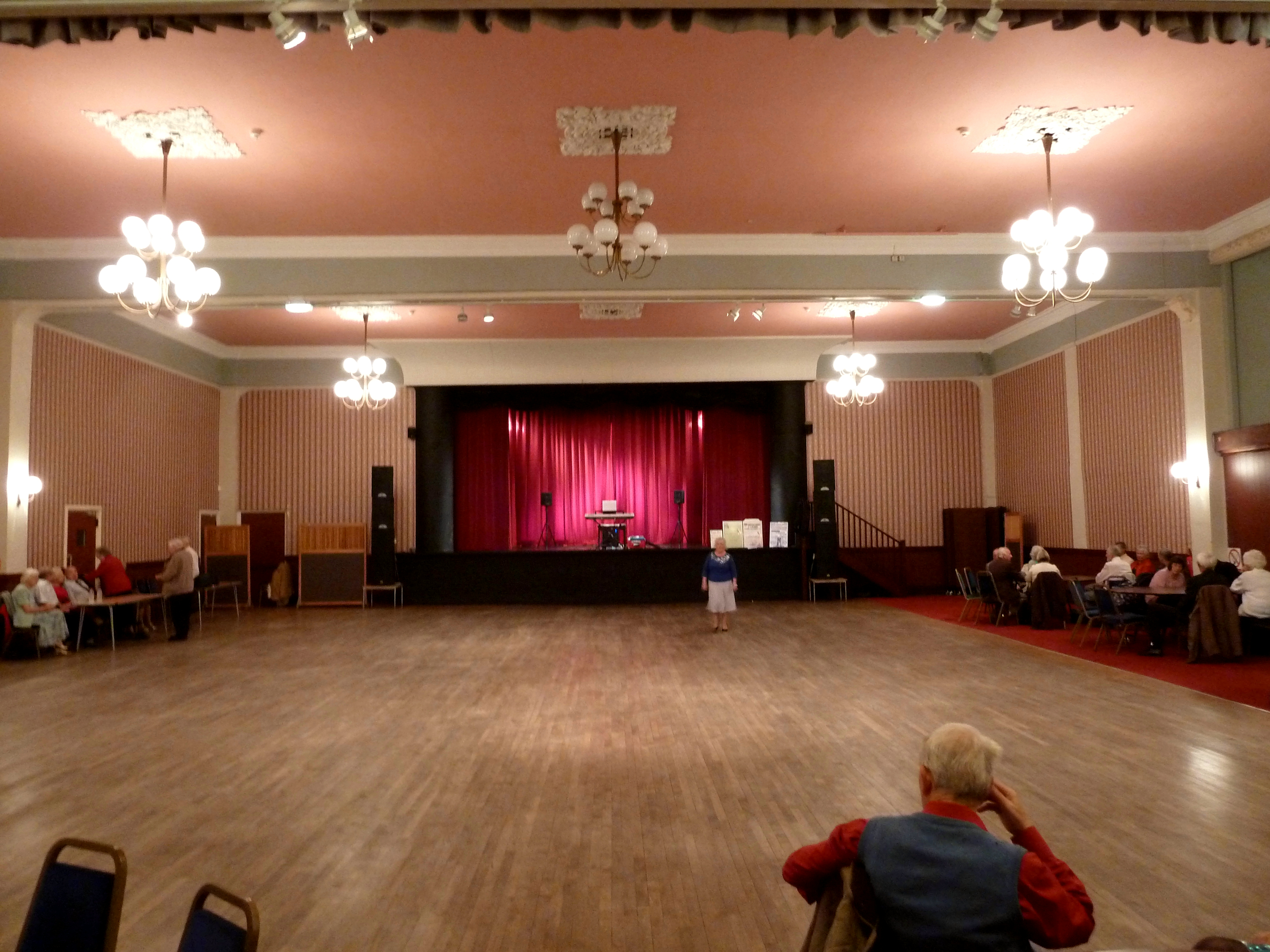
Stage in Hall, 2011

Gerry and the Pacemakers played at the Hall on 1 December 2000 when it reopened after a fire. During summer 2001 the Hall saw tea dances, line dancing, fashion shows and charity events. In November 2001, Herne Bay Operatic Society performed the musical, Chicago, at the Hall. At Christmas 2001 there was a tribute performance called The Elvis Collection, and performances by Meatloaf and The Searchers. At Christmas 2002 there was line dancing and carol concerts by Whitstable and Salvation Army brass bands. In April 2004, Michael Howard MP made a speech about the European elections at the Hall. In 2003, the council was planning many entertainments for the 2004 summer season starting with a variety show hosted by Paul Harris, and followed by audiences with Ann Widdecombe, Clement Freud and John Mortimer; tribute bands including Killer Queen, Cavern Beatles, Buddy Holly and the Cricketers, and Tom and Robbie; performers Kenny Ball, Steve Steen, Pieter-Dirk Uys, Craig Douglas, Maggie Moone and Peter Sarstedt; the John Wilson Orchestra, a Roll Out the Barrel singalong and a Gilbert and Sullivan operetta; and Albert Nobbs presented by Hull Truck Theatre. Shortly before 2005 the Hall saw An Audience with Esther Rantzen and the Circus of Horrors, and in 2005 there was a retro theme with tribute bands and tea dances. In 2006 there was a Dave Lee charity boxing night, line dancing, salsa classes, tribute acts, weddings, hen nights, Dave Lee, Christmas dinners, and soul band Rubber Biscuit. Tribute acts included Probably Robbie, Killer Queen, Abba Gold, Fake Bee Gees and Neil Duncan's Elvis tribute. The Hall is used by Canterbury City Council to showcase the annual Herne Bay Projects and Business Exhibition.

=== Television ===
==== Cockles ====
In 1983 the BBC used The King's Hall as a setting for its 1984 comedy series, Cockles, starring Joan Sims, in which it was called the "Marine Pavilion, Cocklesea". During this time the back of the auditorium and bar were filled with props, scaffolding and lighting equipment, causing complaints from the local amateur group, Theatrecraft, as the equipment compromised audience space and therefore revenue. Joan Sims said that although the TV show represents Cocklesea as a run-down resort, it is not about Herne Bay.

==== Extreme World Wrestling ====
Extreme World Wrestling was filmed at the Hall by Sky for Life TV in 2002, featuring The Dominator, Voodoo Prince and Jonny Storm.

== Centenary ==
2013 was the centenary year of the completion of the building,

Several celebrations took place, including an Edwardian show and a community lunch.

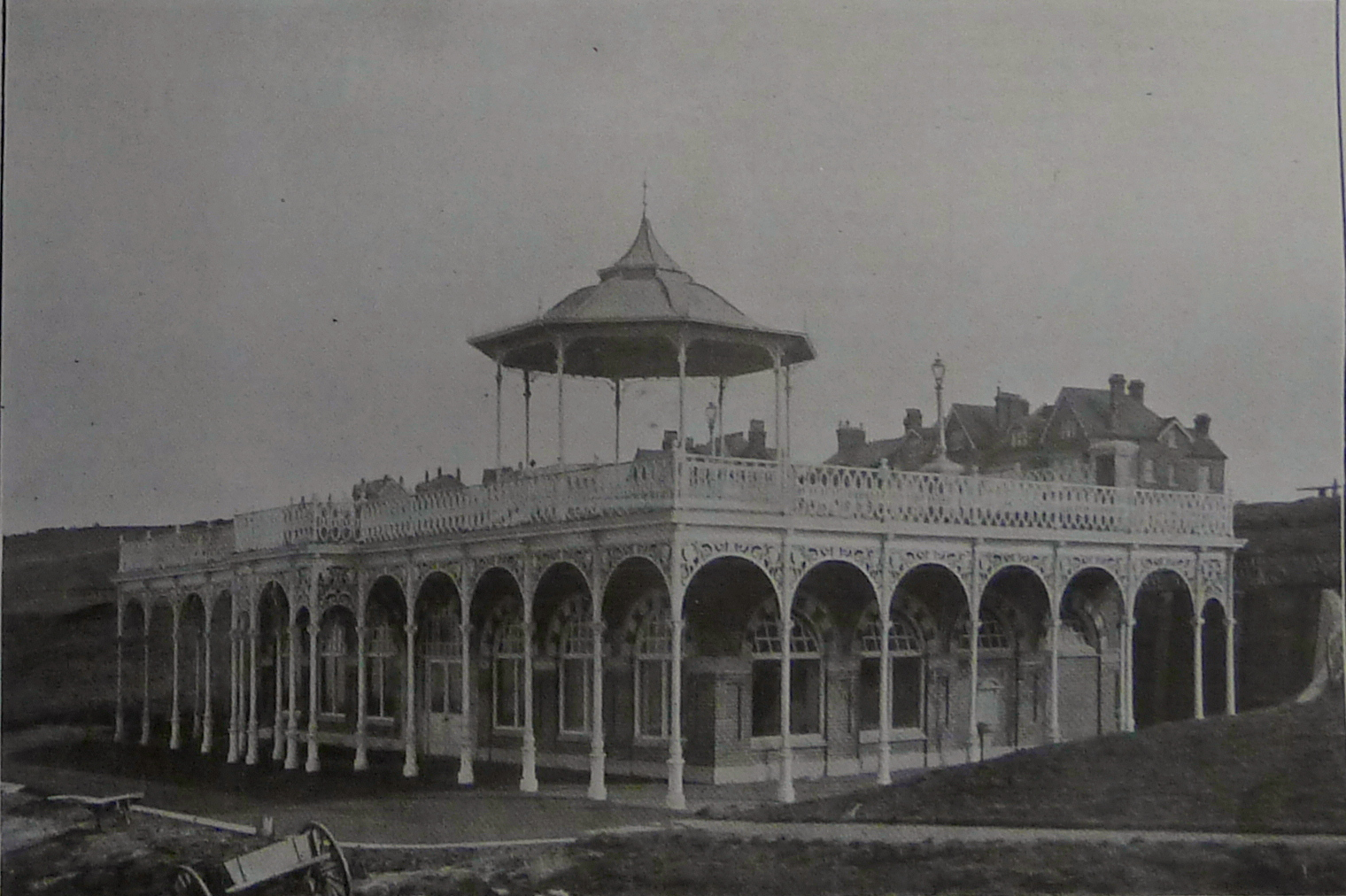
The completed Pavilion in March 1904, its graceful ironwork revealing the influence of the Architecture of India during the British Raj on the architect, F.W.J. Palmer

== Bibliography ==
- Appleton, Georgina (November 2013). Herne Bay Tales: The King's Hall Magic. Canterbury: Canterbury City Press. ISBN 9780904554113.
- Bundock, Mike (10 July 2013). The Kings Hall Herne Bay: celebrating 100 years. Herne Bay Past. Vol. 10. Canterbury: Herne Bay Historical Records Society. ISBN 9781909164093. (Obtainable from HBHRS, and possibly Herne Bay Museum or Herne Bay library)
