= Henry Ward =

Henry Ward may refer to:

== Politicians ==
- Henry Ward, 5th Viscount Bangor (1828–1911), Irish politician
- Henry Ward (barrister) (died 1556), English barrister and politician
- Henry Ward (Kentucky politician) (1909–2002), American politician from Kentucky
- Henry Alfred Ward (1849–1934), Canadian politician from Ontario
- Sir Henry George Ward (1797–1860), English diplomat and politician

== Scientists ==
- Henry Augustus Ward (1834–1906), American naturalist
- Henry Baldwin Ward (1865–1945), American zoologist

== Sportsmen ==
- Henry Ward (baseball), American baseball player
- Henry Ward (basketball) (born 1952), American professional basketball player

== Others ==
- Henry Ward (architect) (1854–1927), English architect working in Hastings
- Henry Ward (artist) (born 1971), British artist
- Henry Ward (VC) (1823–1867), English recipient of the Victoria Cross in the Indian Mutiny
- Henry Arthur Ward (1889–1908), Birmingham whistle maker
- Henry Dana Ward (1797–1884), American abolitionist, anti-Masonic campaigner, and Millerite Adventist
- Henry Galbraith Ward (1851–1933), American judge
- Henry Snowden Ward (1865–1911), English photographer and author
- Henry Ward (revolutionary), delegate to the Stamp Act Congress

== See also ==
- H. M. A. Warde (Henry Murray Ashley Warde, 1850–1940), British soldier and Chief Constable of Kent
- Sir Henry Warde (British Army officer), British Army officer and colonial governor
- Harry Ward (disambiguation)
