= H. E. Chapman =

British soldier and police officer

Major H. E. Chapman CBE DL

Chief Constable of Kent County Constabulary
- In office 1921–1940
- Preceded by: H. M. A. Warde
- Succeeded by: John Arthur Davison

Personal details
- Born: Harry Ernest Chapman; 19 February 1870 Telega, Austria-Hungary
- Died: 12 January 1944 (aged 73) Bembridge, Isle of Wight

Major Harry Ernest Chapman, CBE, DL (19 February 1870 – 12 January 1944) was a British soldier and police officer. He served as Chief Constable of Kent County Constabulary from January 1921 to 1940, having previously been Deputy Chief Constable.

Chapman was commissioned a second lieutenant in the Border Regiment on 9 April 1892, served in the Waziristan Field Force, 1894–95, and was promoted to lieutenant on 1 July 1895. He was promoted to captain on 18 June 1902.

== Honours ==
He was appointed Officer of the Order of the British Empire (OBE) in the 1920 civilian war honours and Commander of the Order of the British Empire (CBE) in the 1939 New Year Honours.

Police appointments
Preceded by H. M. A. Warde	Chief Constable of Kent; 1921–1940	Succeeded by John Arthur Davison
