= Harry Ward =

Harry Ward may refer to:

- Harry Ward (athlete) (ca. 1901-1965), American college and professional athlete and Negro league baseball player in the 1920s and 1930s
- Harry Ward (cricketer) (1924–1993), Australian cricketer
- Harry Ward (darts player) (born 1997), English darts player
- Harry F. Ward (1873–1966), first national chairman of the American Civil Liberties Union
- Harry Marshall Ward (1854–1906), British botanist

== See also ==
- Harry Ward Leonard (1861–1915), American electrical engineer and inventor
- Henry Ward (disambiguation)
