= F. W. J. Palmer =

English civil engineer, structural engineer and surveyor

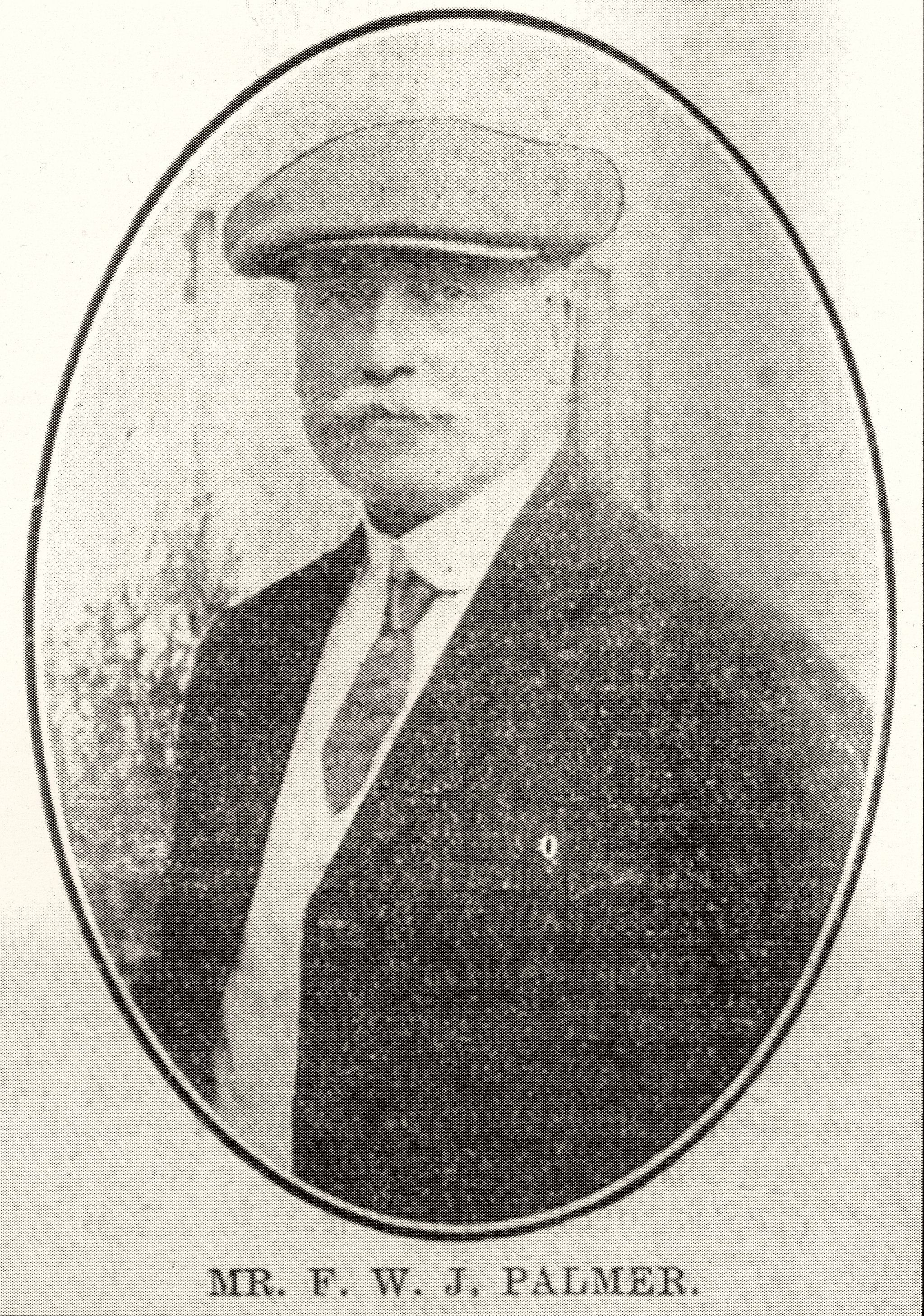
- F. W. J. Palmer, 1913
- Born: Frederick William J. Palmer; 1864; Wimbledon, Surrey, England
- Died: 1947 (aged 82–83); Bridge, Kent, England
- Occupations: civil engineer, structural engineer, surveyor.
- Employer: Herne Bay Urban District Council
- Notable work: King's Hall, Herne Bay

Frederick William J. Palmer, CE, (1864–1947), known professionally as F. W. J. Palmer, was an English civil engineer, structural engineer and surveyor. From 1891 he was Surveyor to Herne Bay Urban District Council. As Town Surveyor between at least 1891 and 1915 he was responsible for arranging the digging up of a great deal of Herne Bay. He organised the reconstruction of all the main roads, saw to the rebuilding of the council offices and Hampton Pier and led the construction of a new sea wall. He led the Sewerage of the East Cliff and nine miles of private roads at the east end of Herne Bay. He designed both phases (1904 and 1913) of the King's Hall, Herne Bay. His works helped to provide employment and to make the town what it is today. Archaeological artefacts turned up by his constant digging contributed to the collection now in Herne Bay Museum.

== Background ==
Frederick William J. Palmer, son of contractor Jabez Palmer of Norwood, Surrey, (Note: Jabez Palmer (born Norwood, Surrey 1829). GRO index: Deaths Mar 1916 Palmer Jabez 87 Mildenhall 4a 1106.) was born in Wimbledon, Surrey in 1864 and died in Bridge, Kent, aged 84, in 1947. (Note: Frederick William J. Palmer (Wimbledon 1864 – Bridge 1947). GRO index: Births Jun 1864 Palmer Frederick William Lambeth 1d 314. Deaths Mar 1947 Palmer Frederick W J. 84 Bridge 5b 101.) The 1871 census finds him aged seven at Kingston, Surrey. In 1881 at age 17 he was a civil engineering student, boarding at 22 Alexandra Gardens, Folkestone. He married Frances Mary Turner, daughter of H. Turner of Folkestone Waterworks, at the Congregational Church, Folkestone, on 23 August 1886. (Note: Frances Mary "Fanny" Turner. GRO index: Marriages Sep 1886 Palmer Frederick William J. and Turner Frances Mary Elham 2a 1484.) The 1901 census describes him as an engineer and surveyor aged 38 in Herne Bay. In 1911 he was 48 years old and living in Sea View Road, Herne Bay, with his family. His son, Graham Knight Palmer, (Note: Graham Knight Palmer (Herne Bay 5 November 1893 – Pershore 1975). GRO index: Births Mar 1894 Palmer Graham Knight Blean 2a 853. Deaths Sep 1975 Palmer Graham Knight 5NO1893 Pershore 29 58[17].) was a surveyor to Herne Bay Urban District Council. He was gazetted a lieutenant in the Royal Flying Corps in November 1916, and flight commander in 1917. In 1919, after the First World War ended, an Avro biplane visited Herne Bay, so that some residents, including Palmer, experienced their first flight.

== Career ==
He was articled to Alexander William Conquest (1848–1892), who was borough engineer and surveyor of Ramsgate and then of Folkestone, and who was the son of William Conquest, secretary to Joseph Bazalgette who created the London sewerage system. Palmer was then appointed assistant borough engineer and surveyor of Folkestone, remaining in that position until 1886, when he became assistant surveyor of the Vestry of the Parish (later Borough) of Fulham. In both positions he was working under A.W. Conquest. Subsequently, in 1891 he became the surveyor to Herne Bay Urban District Council, and remained there until at least 1915. Sea defences were a major part of Palmer's duties, and much time was spent on designing breastwork along the sea front. One of the tasks of this job was to act as a regular retrospective weatherman via local newspapers, to allow assessment of recent trends. He was additionally appointed as sanitary inspector of nuisances on 12 August 1892. He became a member of the Institution of Civil Engineers on 25 April 1896.

Lord Mayor's coach, Herne Bay, 3 August 1910

On 3 August 1910, the Lord Mayor of London visited Herne Bay to open the new Pier Pavilion. The lord mayor was celebrated with a great civic pageant led by mounted police, followed by thirteen carriages bearing the grandees of Herne Bay Urban District Council, with Palmer and his wife travelling in the 12th carriage. The council men were followed by three state coaches. The last of these was the Lord Mayor's dress chariot, drawn by four grey horses. The band of the 2nd battalion of the Northumberland Fusiliers brought up the rear with "lively music" with the Boys' Brigades carrying rifles. During the First World War, and as a member of the council, Palmer was additionally appointed executive officer under the Cultivation of Lands Order 1916. That included organising the spraying of potatoes for the war effort. Palmer trained assistants and apprentices, one of whom was T.E. Holness of Herne Bay, who passed the diploma examination of the Institute of Municipal and County Engineers, and became assistant surveyor to Watford Council.

== Works at Herne Bay ==
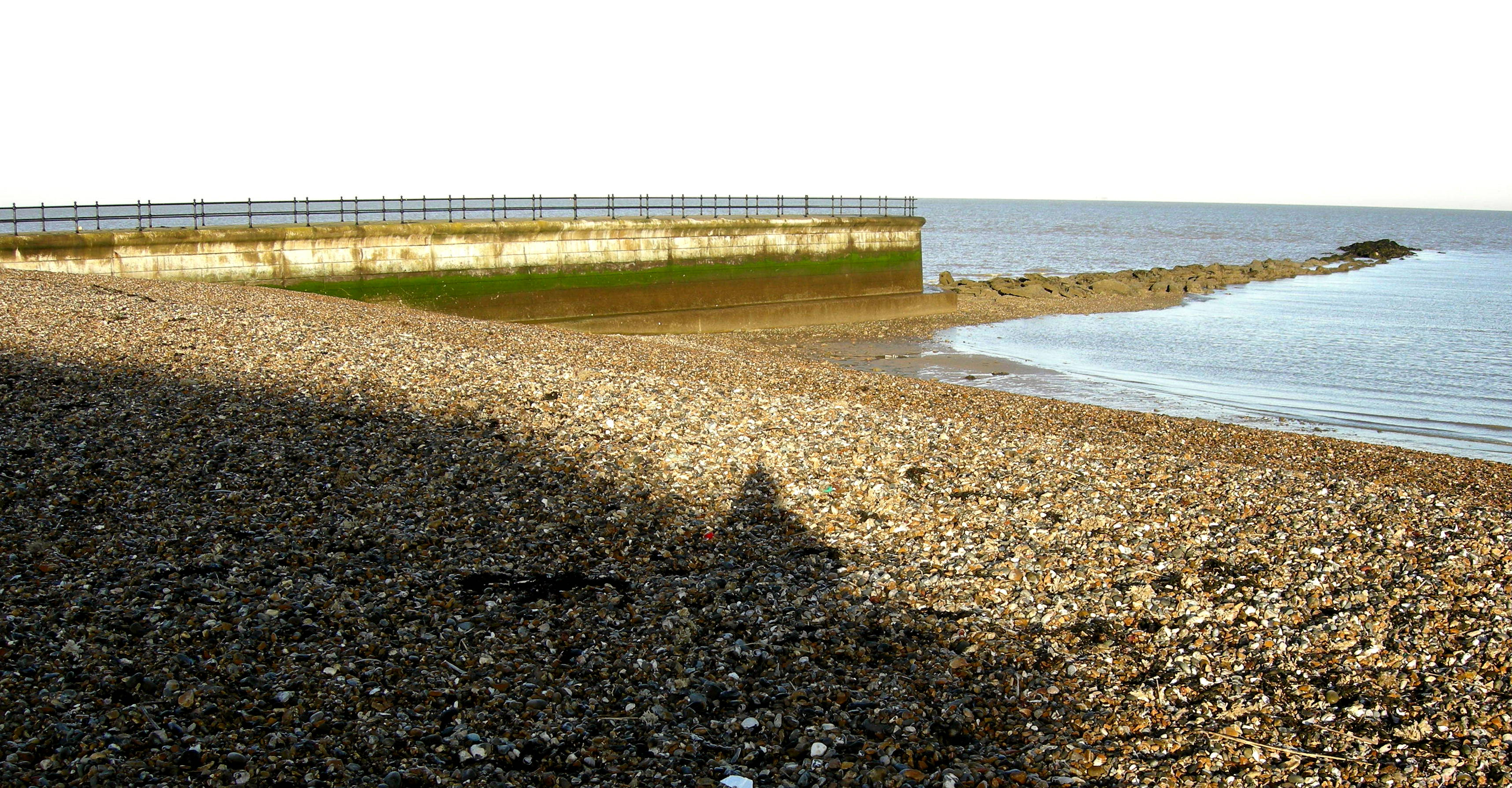
Hampton Pier rebuilt by Palmer in 1903–1904

At Herne Bay between 1891 and 1915 (and probably longer) he carried out numerous fundamental engineering works. This involved excavating a large proportion of the town, and this cannot have gone unnoticed by the inhabitants. However, by virtue of his duties as Surveyor to the council, he contributed to a great extent in providing employment and in making the town what it is today. All this digging was certainly appreciated by the acquisitive antiquarian, Dr Tom Bowes, who subsequently donated stone tools, pottery and artefacts, found by workmen and builders, to the collection that was to become Herne Bay Museum and Gallery.

Palmer was involved in the complete reconstruction of all the main roads before Kent County Council took them over. He oversaw the entire renovation of Herne Bay's Town Hall, including the erection of a new gallery, and he directed the enlargement and construction of the Council Offices in Herne Bay High Street. He was responsible for the 1903–1904 reconstruction of 350 feet (110 m) of Hampton Pier, "which sets as a protection against the inroads of sea along the whole front" of the town. Until at least the 1950s a local "concrete tomb" urban myth survived, suggesting that a construction worker had fallen into the poured concrete of Hampton Pier and was still there. During 1913 Palmer was responsible for the design and section-by-section construction of a new concrete sea wall. He also designed the Tower Lavatories on the sea front.

=== Street decorations for Princess Louise, 1907 ===
The council's and the public's street decorations on this occasion were directed or approved by Palmer. On 24 July 1907, Princess Louise, Duchess of Argyll, daughter of Queen Victoria and sister of King Edward VII, arrived to open an extension to the Passmore Edwards Railway Men's Convalescent Home at Blacksole, Herne Bay. Householders and businesses "vied with each other decorating their properties along the procession route". The Pier Hotel and Messrs Root & Clarke combined to create the traditional arch of the era, made of green vegetation. At the corner of Station Road and the High Street were 22-foot Venetian masts, (Note: James McNeill Whistler's 1889 print, The Venetian Mast, may have been an inspiration for this.) with flowers, bracken and a "welcome" banner. A large crown made of fairy lights was suspended above.

Street decorations, Herne Bay, 24 July 1907

Street decorations, Herne Bay, 24 July 1907

== Works at East Cliff, Herne Bay ==
Palmer prepared a scheme for laying out, draining and scarping East Cliff, which cost £40,000, labour being supplied by the Central Unemployed Body For London. He "designed the scheme for sewering the whole of East Cliff including a 30-inch cast iron pipe sewer along the foot of the cliff and a 30-inch cast iron pipe up the face of the cliff." He "designed and supervised the construction of the sea defence works at the foot of the East Cliff, reaching from the old boathouse site to practically the eastern boundary of the district; also the top promenade from Belle Vue Road to Sea View Road." He "made up and sewered nearly nine miles of private streets, under the Private Street Works Act" on the West Cliff and East Cliff.

=== The King's Hall, Herne Bay ===
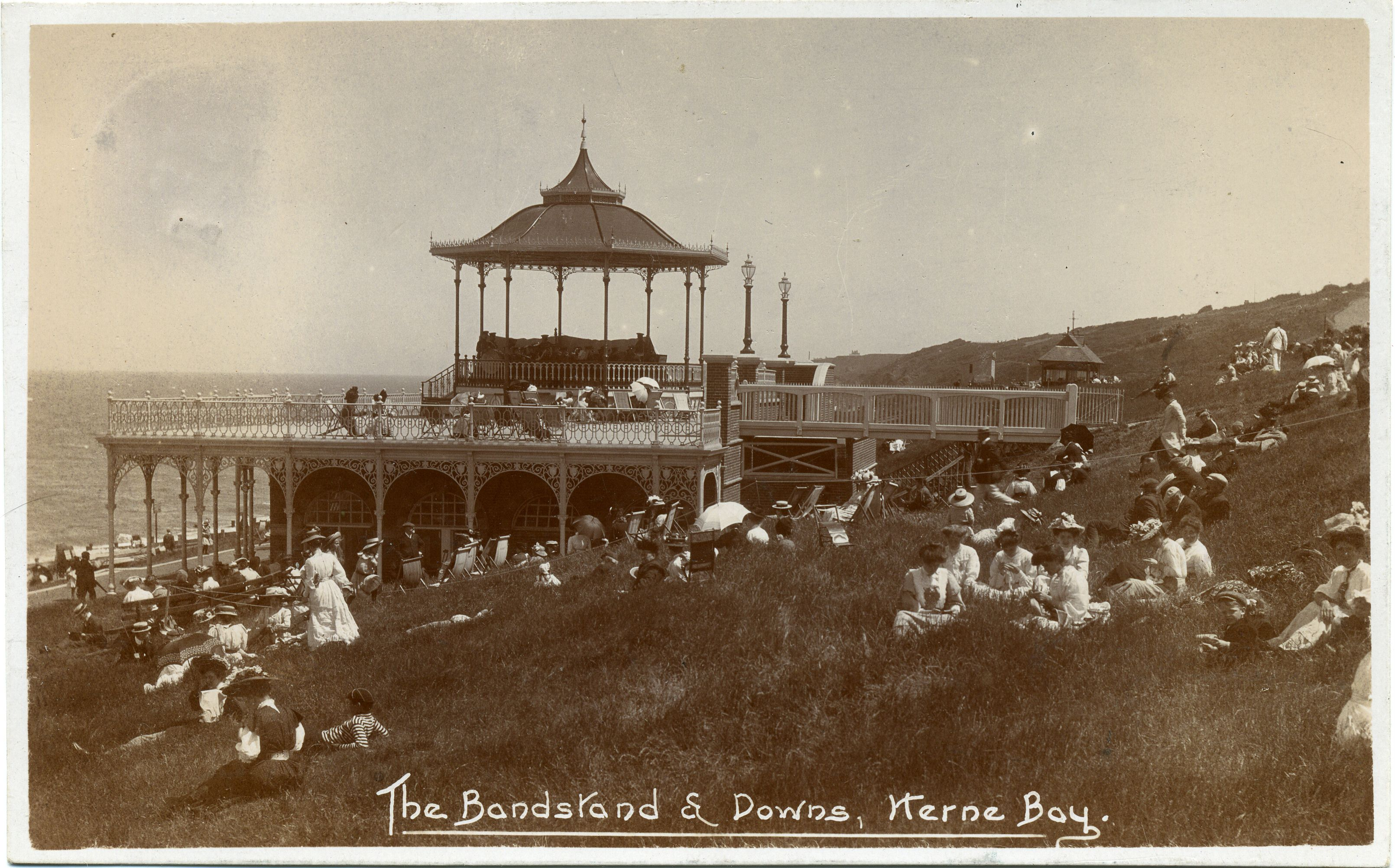
The Pavilion, 1908, showing steep slope excavated by Palmer

This is a theatre, concert hall and dance hall, built as The Pavilion in 1903–1904 and developed as the King Edward VII Memorial Hall in 1913 in memory of the late king. Palmer designed both phases of the building.

=== 1904 phase ===
From July 1902, to 1904 Palmer planned and oversaw the building of the first phase of the Pavilion in his free time as a "labour of love." His plan consisted of a bandstand supported by a small building on a steep slope containing a tea room, rest rooms, a deckchair store and a small, covered auditorium (now the vestibule) to shelter 200 people and a band when it rained. There was no natural hollow ready and waiting. Palmer had to dig a hole:

"6,000 cubic yards (4,600 m^{3}) [of spoil] had to be removed, 12 inches (30 cm) by 12 inches (30 cm) pitch pine piles ranging from 10 feet (3.0 m) to 20 feet (6.1 m) long were driven at stated distances down into the clay, on the north, east and west sides of the site, and connected together by means of 1 inch (2.5 cm) wrought iron tie rods passed through the piles, and interlaced one with the other, and connected together by means of 6 inches (15 cm) by 2.5 inches (6.4 cm) by 1 inch (2.5 cm) iron rings, through which the tie rods were passed, and nuts placed in position, thus enabling the tie rods to be adjusted and tightened to a nicety. The whole of the site was then covered with a solid mass of Portland cement concrete 18 inches (46 cm) thick, which when finished left the ironwork completely embedded in the same. Upon this foundation the superstructure was erected." From a speech by F. W. J. Palmer at the opening of The Pavilion, 4 April 1904.

The gracefulness of the building comes from the iron columns and ornamental ironwork manufactured to Palmer's design by MacFarlane & Co of Glasgow.

=== 1913 phase ===
In 1911 to 1913 Palmer planned and oversaw the building of the second phase of the King's Hall. For this, he had to dig an even bigger hole in October 1912: "many thousands of yards of London Clay" were removed by his team to extend the building into the cliff. The 1904 phase remained as vestibule for the new Hall which was dug into the cliff at its back, or south side. The Hall was intended to accommodate 1,500 people inside, plus an audience of 1,100 above, for the rooftop bandstand. So inside the Hall there were large windows, ceiling roses doubling as natural ventilators, and two large louvred natural ventilators at the corners. The total cost for this phase was £6,000, the high price reflecting the excavation work and the new and fashionable use of ferro-concrete. It was opened in July 1913 by Princess Henry of Battenberg, representing Queen Alexandra. Sixteen horse-drawn carriages brought the royal party and dignitaries to the pier. The royal party travelled from the pier to the site by open motor car. Along that last stage between the pier and the clock tower was an "amazing arch formed by the Herne Bay Fire Brigade".

Firemen's archway, in 1913

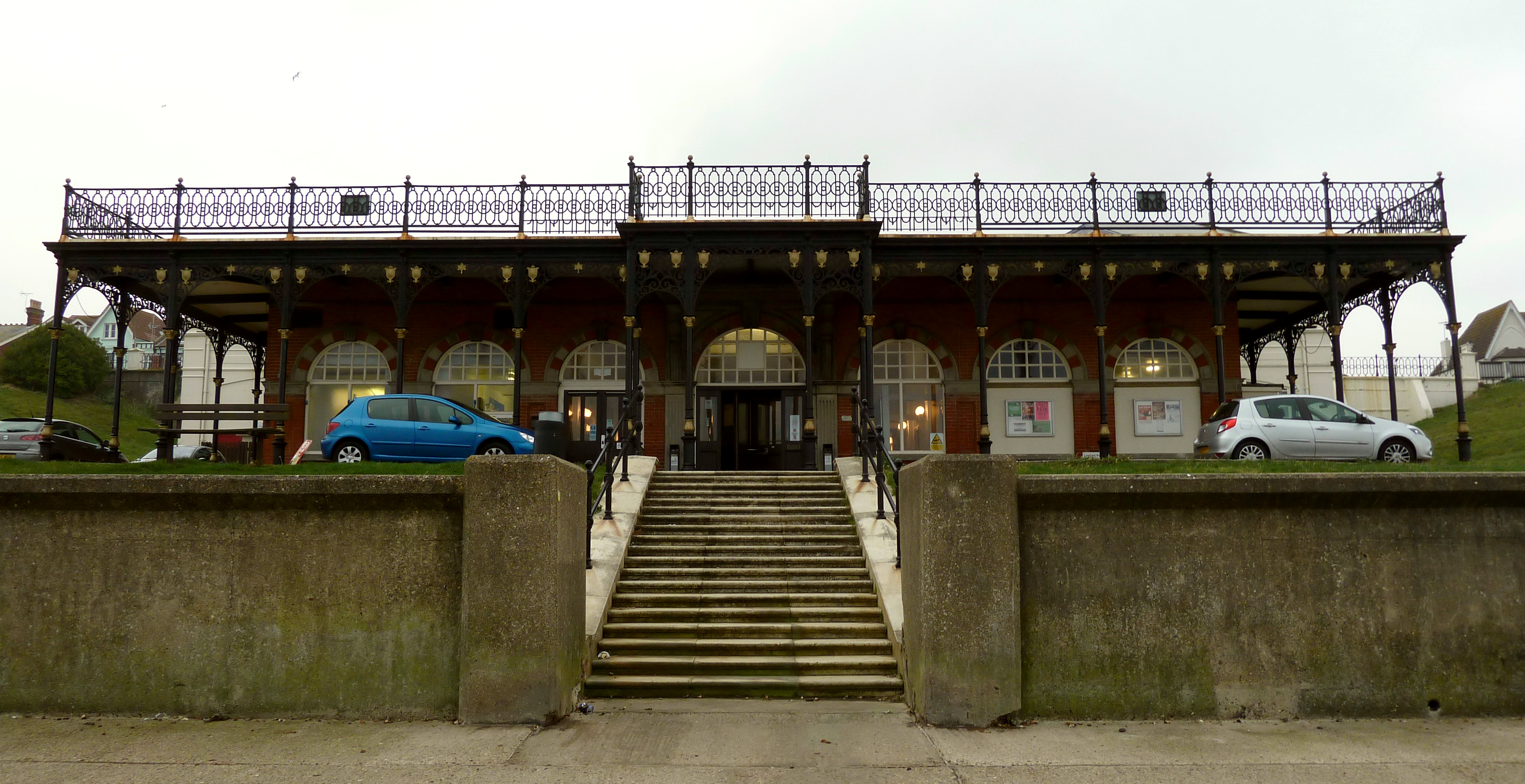
King's Hall, in 2011

=== East Cliff bathing cabins, 1912 ===
East Cliff bathing cabins

These were designed by Palmer. Between 16 March and 3 April 1912, he called for tenders for bathing cabins "including attendants' offices and lavatories (timber construction) together with all the necessary drainage, on the East Cliff, Herne Bay". These bathing huts were built by Griggs & Sons, and were opened on 22 June 1912 by A.J. Iggulden, JP, chairman of the council. The stripes on the cabins signified their use. There were ten green and white cabins for women, ten blue and white cabins for men, and ten central red and white cabins for families. Two pavilions were provided for the ticket office, caretakers and lavatories. Timber jetties allowed barefoot bathers to avoid the discomfort of stepping on the shingle.

=== Memorial Park, 1920–1921 ===
Palmer was responsible for the layout of the town's First World War memorial park, in which the cenotaph was placed on a crossroads between a cricket ground and a bowling green. Land for the purpose was donated to the town by Frederick Gardnor Hopkins, and the council appealed for donations for the memorial. Palmer produced a plan for a public park with a central cenotaph, on the 14-acre donated plot near the railway station. The memorial obelisk was funded by F.G. Hoskins. It was designed and constructed in granite by Messrs John Daymond Ltd of Westminster. It was unveiled on Armistice Day, 11 November 1922, by General Sir Charles Warren, and dedicated by Rev. E.G.F. Macpherson. Today it commemorates the fallen of the First and Second World Wars, and those of the Falklands and Iraq Wars.

Palmer's layout plan

The cenotaph, in 2025

== Baptist Church Sunday Schools and philanthropy ==
Palmer was honorary treasurer to Herne Bay's Baptist Church Sunday Schools. When A. Hammond, superintendent of the schools, retired from his position, Palmer presented him with a book of psalms and hymns at the schools' anniversary service in 1902. His reports at the meeting showed that the schools were raising money for missionary work. In the same year he designed a new Baptist Mission Chapel at Beltinge. Twelve foundation stones were laid on 22 September 1902 by twelve people, including Palmer. While it was under construction, the building was described by the Herne Bay Press thus:

The building ... is simple and plain in style, and consists of a main room 35 feet in length by a little over 20 feet in width with two classrooms at the rear of the platform. It will be well lighted by a large window over the entrance porch, and similar windows on the eastern and western sides. The plans for the building have been prepared by Mr F.W.J. Palmer, C.E ... The seating accommodation will be supplied by chairs of strong make and very comfortable style. The portion of the ground chosen for the present building is toward the north-western corner of the land, so that when necessity arises a larger chapel may be erected to the eastward and the small one be used as schools.

The chapel was opened on 12 April 1903 with a sermon by Rev. J.S. Geale, pastor of the Herne Bay Baptist Chapel. The Herne Bay Press congratulated Palmer on the "handsome and compact structure" and the "very neat appearance" of the interior, saying that "the whole reflects great credit of the architect Mr F.W.J. Palmer and Mr E.T.J. Adams (the builder)". Palmer charged no fees for this work. In 1928 Palmer was appointed superintendent of the Baptist Sunday School in Beltinge. In 1930, dressed as Father Christmas, he presented gifts to the Sunday school children at Beltinge. Palmer and his wife belonged to the Herne Bay Philanthropic Society, among many others in the town, and contributed money for the poor.

Baptist Chapel, Beltinge, 1902, front elevation

Baptist Chapel, Beltinge, 1902, side elevation

== Notes ==
Note: under the Births and Deaths Registration Act 1953, section 34, certified copies of birth, marriage and death entries carrying the General Register Office seal are evidence of the birth or death to which they relate. For verification, anyone can purchase such a certified copy of the certificate from the General Record Office.

== Bibliography ==
- Bundock, Mike (10 July 2013). The Kings Hall Herne Bay: celebrating 100 years. Herne Bay Past. Vol. 10. Canterbury: Herne Bay Historical Records Society. ISBN 9781909164093.
