= Henry Warde (British Army officer, born 1766) =

British Army officer and colonial governor (1766–1834)

General Sir Henry Warde GCB
- Born: 7 January 1766
- Died: 1 October 1834 (aged 68); Dean House, Alresford
- Military career
- Allegiance: United Kingdom
- Branch: British Army
- Service years: 1783–1834
- Rank: General
- Commands: 1st Brigade, 1st Division; Governor of Mauritius; Governor of Barbados
- Conflicts: French Revolutionary Wars; Flanders campaign; Siege of Valenciennes; Anglo-Russian invasion of Holland; Napoleonic Wars; Battle of Copenhagen; Battle of Corunna; Mauritius campaign; Invasion of Isle de France

General Sir Henry Warde GCB (7 January 1766 – 1 October 1834) was a British Army officer and colonial governor.

== Life ==
Born on 7 January 1766, he was the fourth son of John Warde (1721–1775) of Squerryes, by his second wife, Kitty Anne (d. 1767), daughter of Charles Hoskins of Croydon, Surrey. He entered the army as an ensign in the 1st Foot Guards in 1783, and on 6 July 1790 was promoted to a lieutenancy with the brevet rank of captain. In the following year he accompanied his regiment to Holland, but was wounded at the siege of Valenciennes, and returned to England. He rejoined his regiment in June 1794, and continued to serve with it, acting as adjutant to the third battalion, until his promotion to a company, with the brevet rank of lieutenant-colonel, on 15 October 1794, when he was sent home.

Warde served in the expedition to Ostend and the Anglo-Russian invasion of Holland, and received the brevet rank of colonel on 1 January 1801. In 1804 he was nominated brigadier-general, and in 1807 took part in the expedition to Copenhagen, his name being included in the votes of thanks from Parliament. In the following year he obtained the rank of major-general. He commanded the first brigade of foot guards sent to Spain in 1808 with the force under Sir David Baird, and returned to England in 1809 after the battle of Coruña, his name again appearing in the parliamentary vote of thanks.

In the same year 1809 Warde was sent to India, and served under Lieutenant-general John Abercromby in the Mauritius campaign of 1809–11. He remained on Mauritius for some time in command of the troops, and acted as governor from 9 April to 12 July 1811. In 1813 he was appointed to the colonelcy of the 68th Foot, and in the same year was promoted to the rank of lieutenant-general. On the enlargement of the Order of the Bath on 2 January 1815 he was nominated K.C.B.

On 8 February 1821 Warde was appointed governor of Barbados, in succession to Lord Combermere. He arrived in the island on 25 June, and continued in office until 21 June 1827. His administration saw differences between the two branches of the legislature, the council and the house of assembly; and rumours of emancipation. In 1830 he attained the rank of general, and in 1831 was appointed colonel of the 31st Foot. On 13 September of the same year he was nominated G.C.B.

Warde died at his residence, Dean House, near Alresford in Hampshire, on 1 October 1834.

== Family ==
On 28 May 1808 Warde married Molina (1776–1835), daughter of John Thomas of Hereford. They had five sons—Henry John, Edward Charles, Frederick Moore, Walter, and Augustus William. A daughter, Harriett (d. 1874), was married on 4 May 1826 to Francis North, 6th Earl of Guilford. North died on 29 January 1861, and she was married, secondly, to John Lettsom Elliott on 10 February 1863.

== Notes ==
Attribution

This article incorporates text from a publication now in the public domain: Lee, Sidney, ed. (1899). "Warde, Henry". Dictionary of National Biography. Vol. 59. London: Smith, Elder & Co.
