= H. M. A. Warde =

Lieutenant-Colonel H. M. A. Warde CBE

Chief Constable of Kent County Constabulary
- In office 1895–1921

Personal details
- Born: Henry Murray Ashley Warde; 3 September 1850 Woolwich, London, England
- Died: 9 March 1940 (aged 89)

Lieutenant-Colonel Henry Murray Ashley Warde CBE (3 September 1850 – 9 March 1940) was a British soldier and police officer who served as Chief Constable of Kent County Constabulary from 1895 to 1921.

Born in Woolwich, Warde was the son of Major-General Sir Edward Warde, and the brother of the politician Sir Charles Warde and St Andrew Bruce Warde, who became Chief Constable of Hampshire County Constabulary. He was also a nephew of Henry Murray Lane, the Chester Herald. He was commissioned into the 19th Hussars in 1872. He was promoted lieutenant in 1874 and captain in 1882. In 1883 he was seconded to be adjutant of the Berkshire Yeomanry. He was promoted major in 1885 and lieutenant-colonel in 1893. He retired from the army in 1895.

He was appointed Commander of the Order of the British Empire (CBE) in the 1920 civilian war honours. He died at the age of 89.

Police appointments
Preceded by Henry Herbert Edwards	Chief Constable of Kent; 1895–1921	Succeeded by Harry Ernest Chapman
