= Federal Chancellery =

Federal Chancellery may refer to:

- Federal Chancellery of Austria
- German Chancellery
- Federal Chancellery of Switzerland
- Federal Chancellery (Bonn), a building
- Federal Chancellery (Berlin), a building
