= Federal Chancellery (Bonn) =

Former seat of national legislature of West Germany

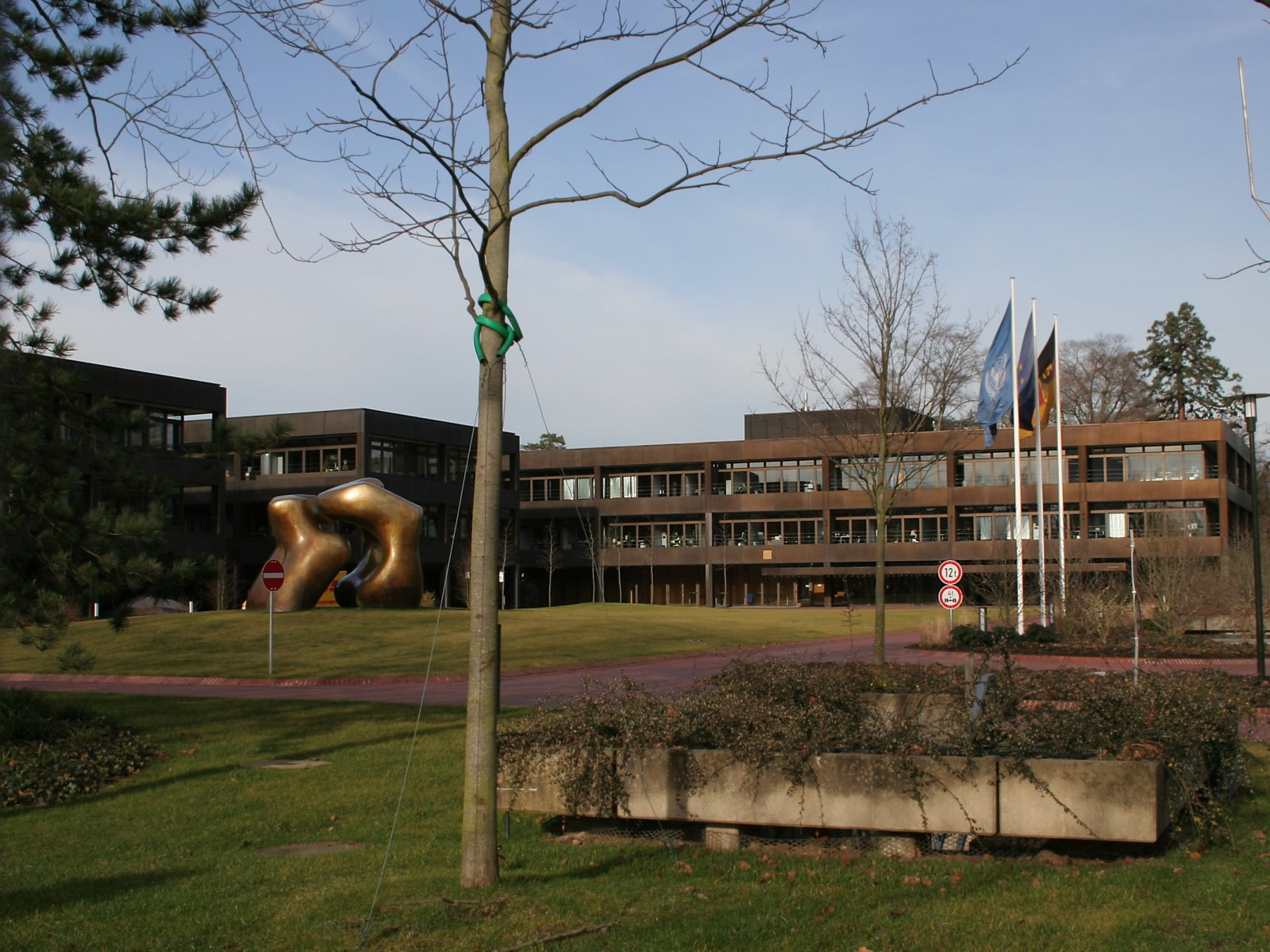
- Chancellery Building (2007)
- Interactive fullscreen map

General information
- Location: Bonn, Germany
- Coordinates: 50°43′10″N 7°07′09″E

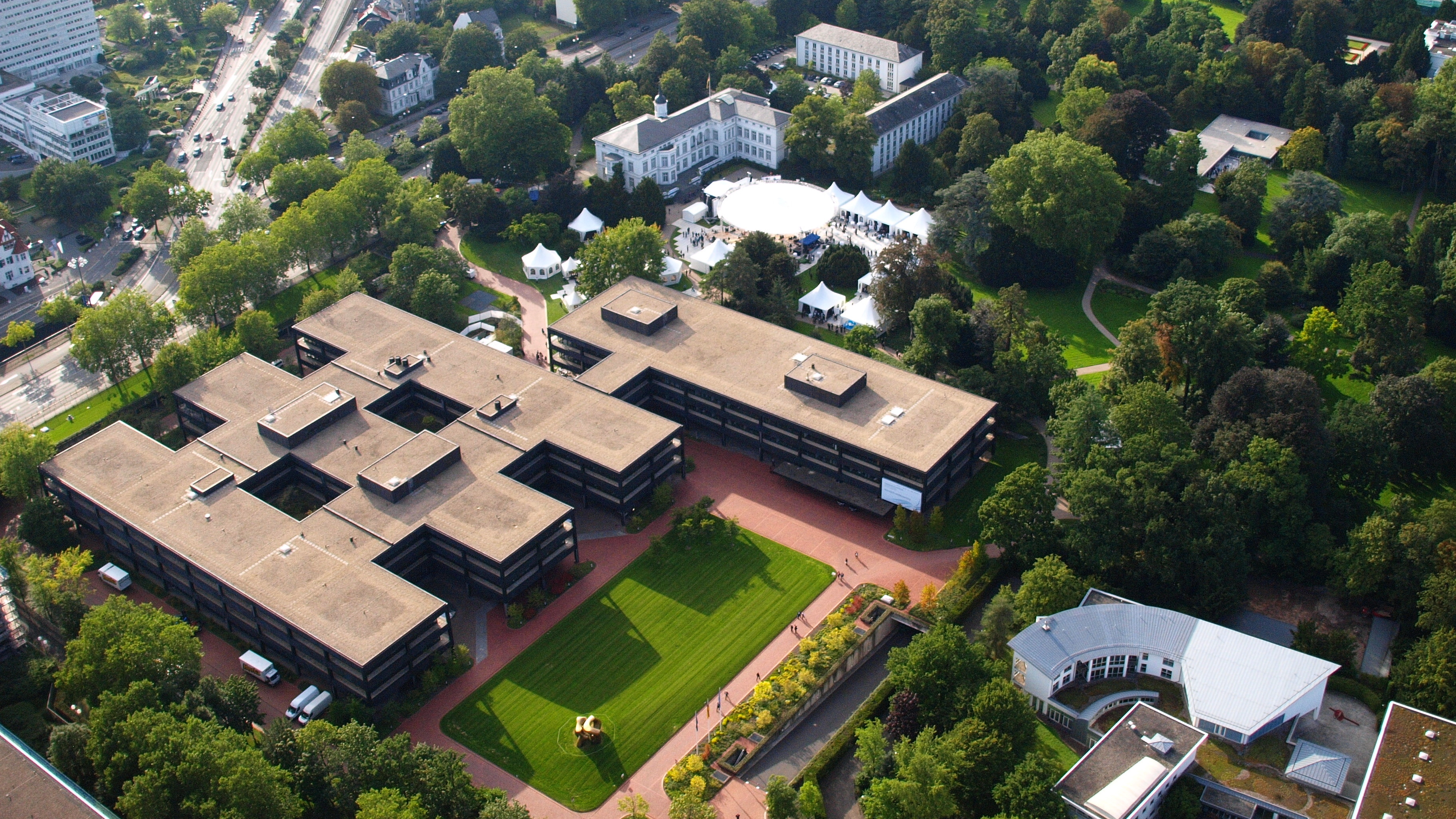
Former Federal Chancellery, aerial photograph

The Federal Chancellery building in Bonn was used from 1976 to 1999 as the seat of the Federal Chancellery of the Federal Republic of Germany, and since 2006 as the seat of the Federal Ministry for Economic Cooperation and Development. It is located in the district of Gronau east of Bundesstraße 9 (Bundeskanzlerplatz) and west of the Bundeshaus and is part of the Route of Democracy.

In 1999, the headquarters of the Federal Chancellery were moved from Bonn to Berlin under the Berlin-Bonn Act, first into the Staatsratsgebäude, then in 2001 to the new building on the Spreebogen; since 2001 the secondary seat of the Federal Chancellery has been the Palais Schaumburg. The area of the former Federal Chancellery is a monument under monument protection.

== History ==
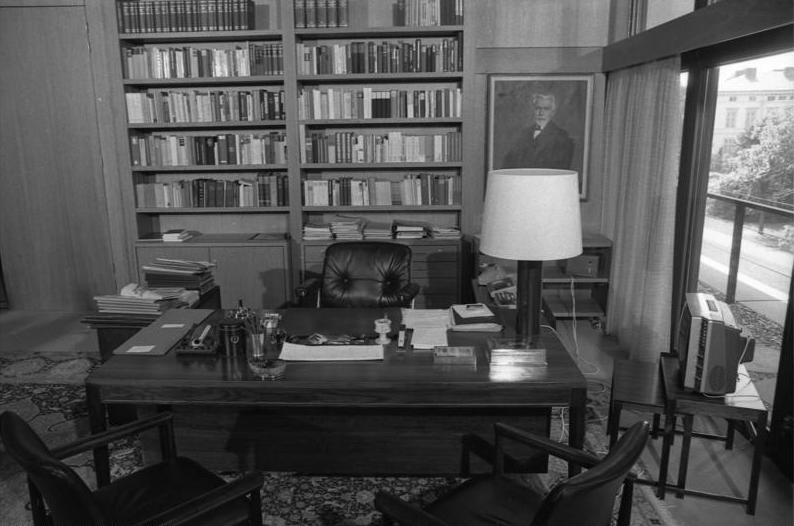
Chancellor Helmut Schmidt's desk, 1976

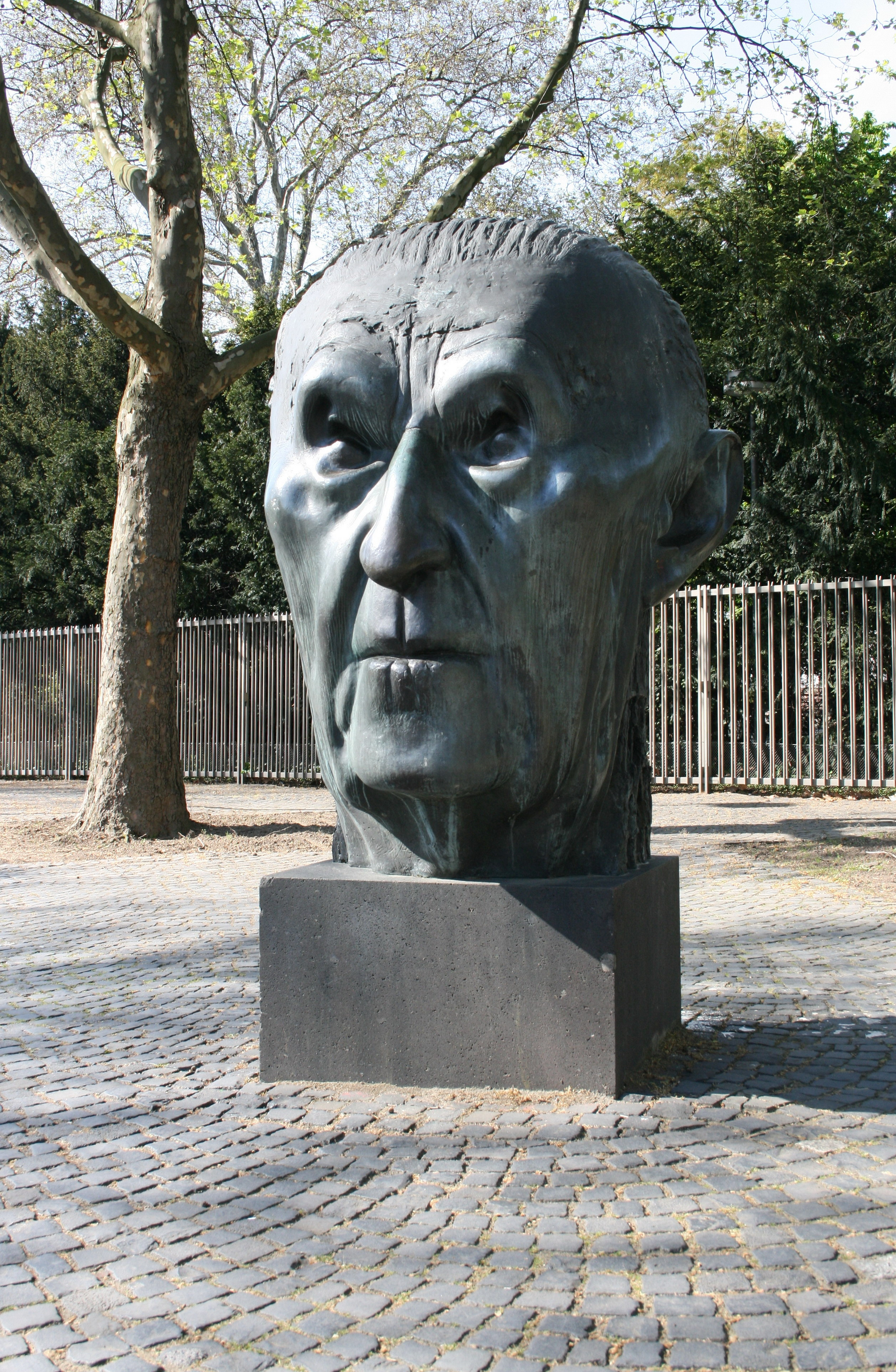
Adenauer-Sculpture by Hubertus von Pilgrim

The first building to serve as the Chancellery of the Federal Republic was the Palais Schaumburg in Bonn from 1949 onwards. In 1954/55, "supplementary buildings" ("Old Chancellery") were built as "Houses 2 and 3". In 1969, the social-liberal coalition under Willy Brandt and his chancellor Horst Ehmke was expanded to include various aspects of education, social and technology policy. In order to meet the growing requirements, for which the extended grounds of the palace had become too small, the Federal Government decided in December 1969, to build a new chancellery building immediately south of the old one on the so-called 'Görreswiese' in the immediate vicinity of the Press and Information Office of the Federal Government. Planning was the task of the Planning Group Stieldorf, which was the winner of a contest open to the public as a winner. A separate competition took place for the artistic design of the buildings and the outdoor area. Construction began in 1973 and in July 1976 the architecturally simple new building was inaugurated. The Palais Schaumburg was still used, but primarily for purposes of representation, and the "Old Chancellery" was taken over by the Auswärtiges Amt The park, with a central driveway from Görresstraße, surrounds a third building, the Kanzlerbungalow, which served as the official residence of the Federal Chancellor.

The Federal Chancellery consists of a three-storey complex with two lower floors, which is divided into two parts: the so-called "department building" and the "chancery and cabinet building". The department building is built on a ground raster, which produces almost 100 square meters of supporting surfaces in the interior, and is entered by the main entrance on the Rhine side (in the east). To the north of the department building is the much smaller chancery and cabinet building with separate entrance. The ground floor facades are largely recessed and fully glazed in order to provide the best possible view into the old park landscape behind (at the time of planning, there were still plans to make the site accessible to the public).

The free steel skeleton construction (with only six concrete cores as fixed points) allows the adaptation to all organizational requirements by means of variable walls. The low - rise development (below the crowns of the park and the first of the Palais Schaumburg) - with a new volume of more than 200,000 cubic meters, 30,000 m^{2} of floor space and 13,000 m^{2} of façade - justified the decision of the Jury for price and execution.

The architectural quality of the building was controversial. Critics criticized against this indecisive and reserved urban development. Federal Chancellor Helmut Schmidt is attributed the quotation that the building has the "charm of a Rhineland savings bank". But the "urban redevelopment", certain purism aesthetic qualities demanded in the competition tender of the Federal Building Administration and also the functional analysis of the internal structure (fully flexible ground plans) highlighted.

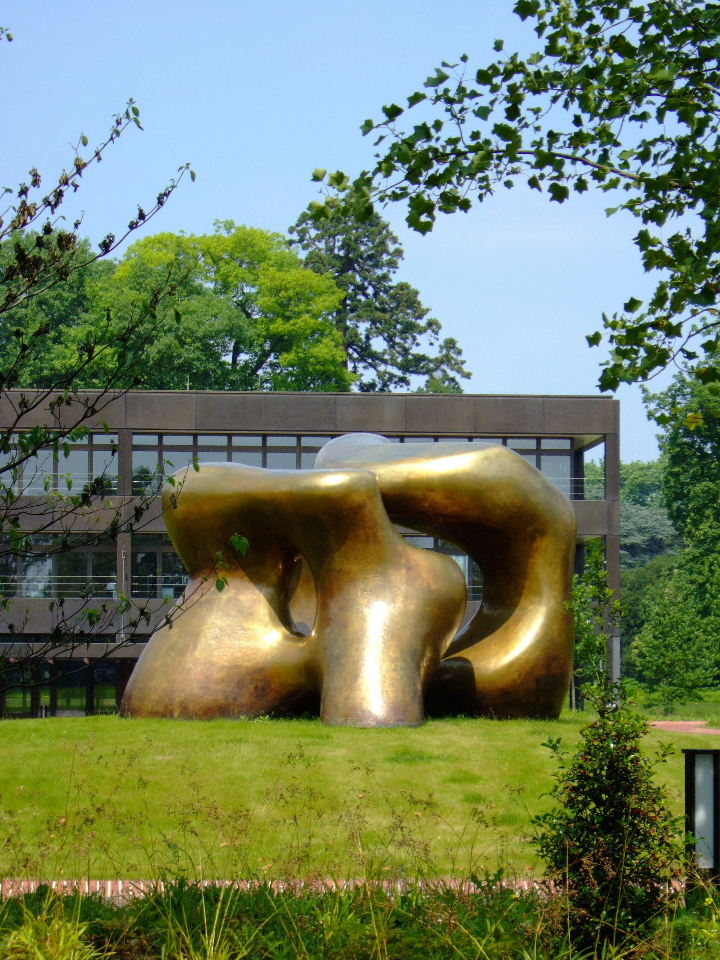
Large Two Forms by Henry Moore

In 1979, Helmut Schmidt, the first occupier of the building, transformed the forecourt of the new building, creating a large green area where the sculpture Large Two Forms by Henry Moore) was installed. In May 1982 a bust of Konrad Adenauer, who became the symbol of the Bonn Republic, was erected on the nearby Chancellor's Place .

In the wake of the capital decision, the Federal Chancellery moved its headquarters to Berlin in 1999. In the Bonn Federal Chancellery building, a secondary seat was left, which was transferred to the Palais Schaumburg in May 2001. At the same time, the building was handed over to the Federal Ministry for Economic Cooperation and Development (BMZ). In order to enable the Ministry to move into the property, a comprehensive renovation was implemented during the period from 1999 to 2005, with a total of one of the largest asbestos recovery measures implemented in Germany. The BMZ moved from the "Bonn Karree" south of the Museumsmeile to the former Chancellery.

== See also ==
- Federal Chancellery (Berlin), The official seat of the German Chancellor in Berlin
- German Chancellery, The executive office of the Chancellor of Germany

== Literature ==
- Claudia Euskirchen, Olaf Gisbertz, Ulrich Schäfer, and others. a. (Edited): North Rhine-Westphalia I. Rhineland . (= Georg Dehio (†): Dehio Handbook of the German Art Monuments). German art publishing house, Munich 2005, ISBN 978-3422030930, S.
- Andreas Denk, Ingeborg Flag: Architectural leader Bonn . Dietrich Reimer Verlag, Berlin 1997, ISBN 3-496-01150-5, p.
- Ingeborg flag: Architecture in Bonn after 1945 . Verlag Ludwig Röhrscheid, Bonn 1984, ISBN 3-7928-0479-4, p. 53.
- Wilfried Täubner: Planning group Stieldorf. Buildings and Projects, Cologne, 1974, pp. 15–19.
- Harald Biermann: The Federal Chancellors and their offices (ed. Stiftung Haus der Geschichte der Bundesrepublik Deutschland), Bonn 2006.
- Gabriele Zabel-Zottmann: Sculptures and objects in the public space of the federal capital Bonn. From 1970 to 1991. Dissertation, Bonn 2012. S. 48-67 (online (PDF file; 6.01 MB))
