= Federal Ribbon =

Arrangement of buildings in the government district in Berlin

Coordinates: 52.5200°N 13.3719°E

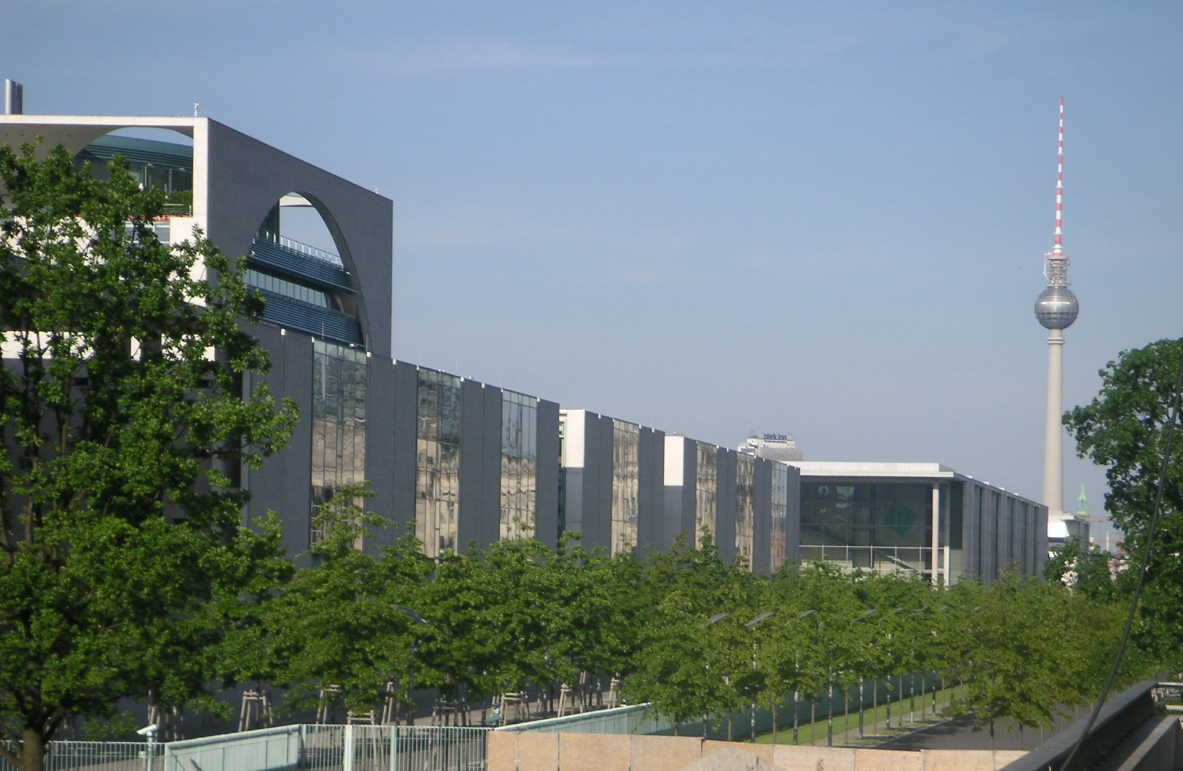
View of the Band des Bundes along the Federal Chancellery towards the Paul-Löbe-Haus, with the Berlin TV Tower visible in the background

Berlin's Federal Ribbon (German: Band des Bundes) is an architectural ensemble that runs across the government district north of the Reichstag building across the Spreebogen on the edge of the Spreebogenpark. The concept was designed by the architects Axel Schultes and Charlotte Frank.

== Overview ==
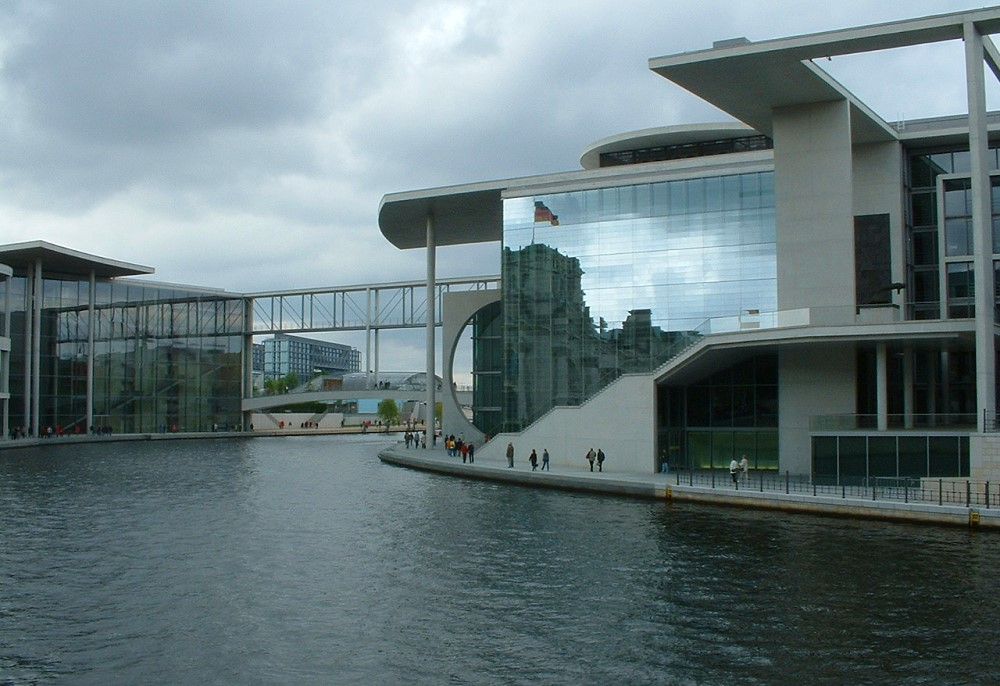
View of the Marie-Elisabeth-Lüders-Haus and a river-crossing, forming part of the "ribbon."

The ribbon of buildings is approximately 900 metres long. From the air, all the buildings belonging to it appear like a massive white bar that lies across the arch of the river Spree and crosses the Spree twice. The impression of the connection is reinforced by the bridges over the Spree between the buildings of the band.

The individual elements (from west to east) are:

- the Kanzlerpark, on the right bank of the Spree, with helicopter landing facility
- the Kanzleramtssteg (Chancellery bridge) across the Spree
- the Federal Chancellery, on the left bank of the Spree, including the elongated office wing
- the vacant lot of the originally planned Citizens' Forum (abandoned, now urban space)
- the Paul-Löbe-Haus with offices and committee rooms
- the Marie-Elisabeth-Lüders-Steg, a pedestrian bridge with two levels across the Spree
- the Marie-Elisabeth-Lüders-Haus with parliamentary library and archive

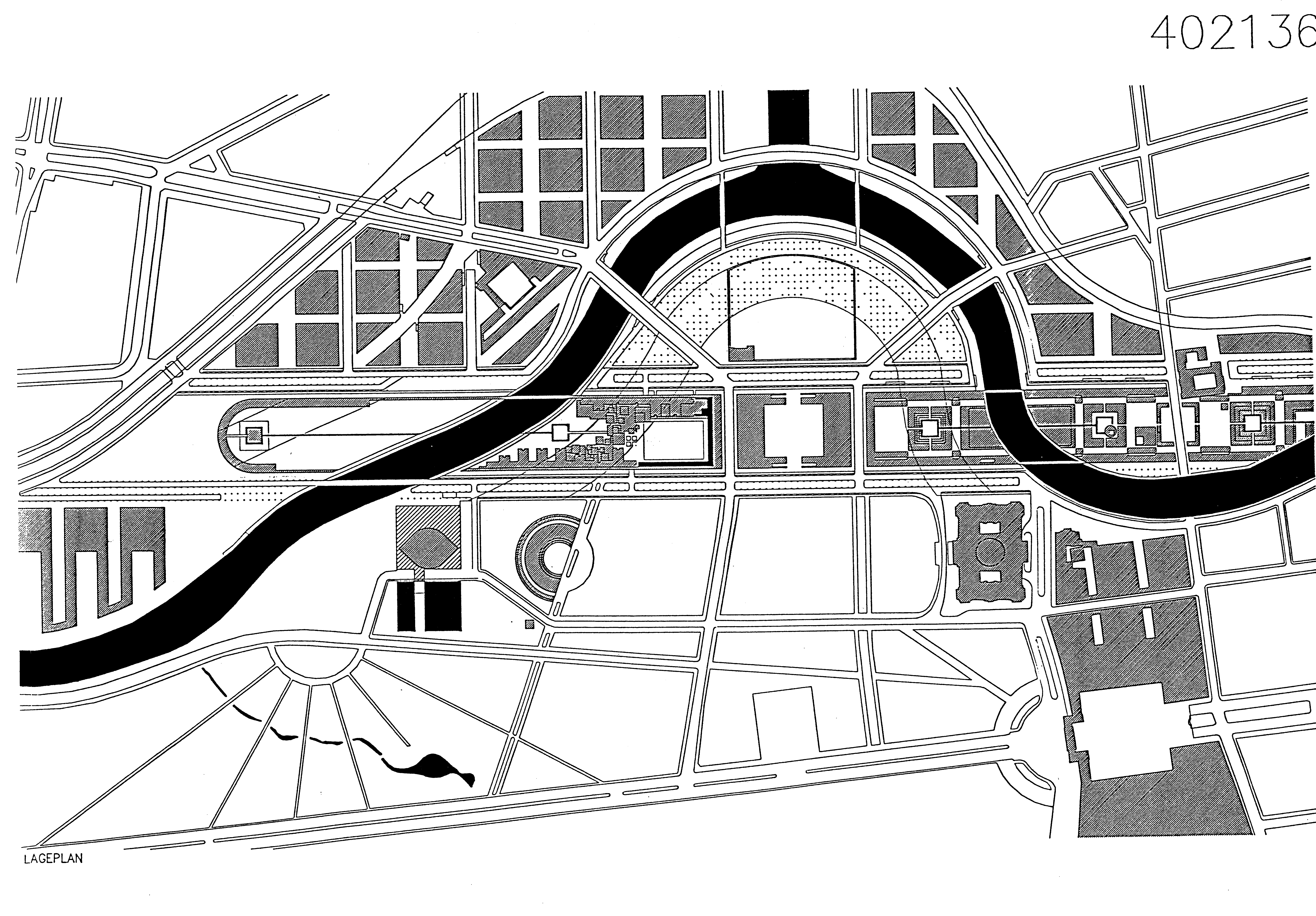
Plans for the "Band des Bundes" by architects Axel Schultes und Charlotte Frank, 1992

Originally it was planned to extend the line, crossing the Spree a third time to Berlin Friedrichstraße station, but this plan was abandoned for cost reasons and because the station would have had to be converted beforehand. However, the Marie-Elisabeth-Lüders-Haus is currently being expanded by two courtyards to the east and its main entrance is being relocated to the Luisenstraße. The extension was originally supposed to be completed in mid-2015. After considerable delays, the completion date will only be limited to the period up to 2021.

The plan for the Citizens' Forum has been abandoned; instead the road connection, which was previously provisional, will be made permanent.
