= Federal Chancellery, Berlin =

Official residence and office of the chancellor of Germany

Federal Chancellery Complex
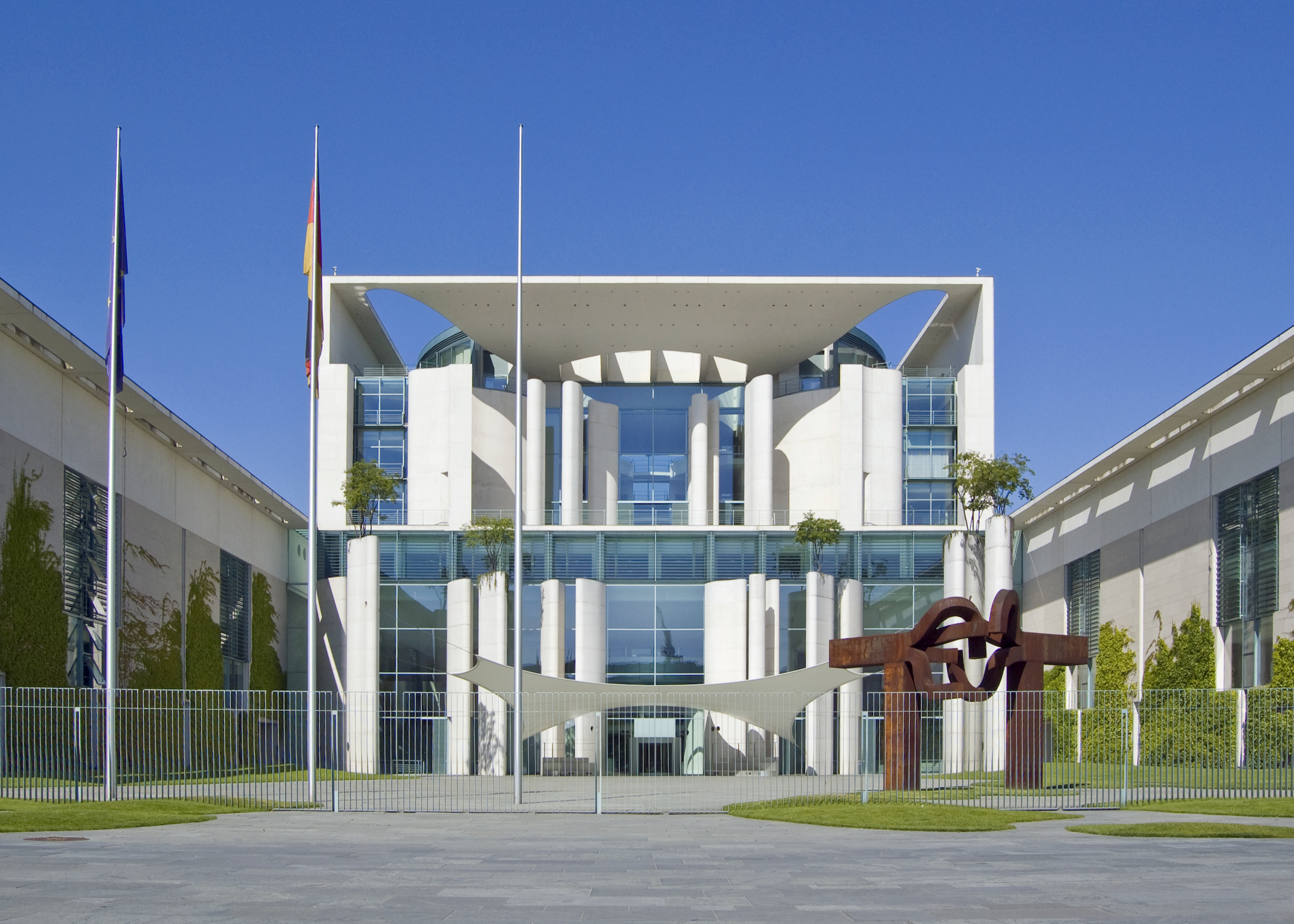
- Alternative names: Bundeskanzleramt

General information
- Type: Government seat
- Location: Willy-Brandt-Straße 1; 10557, Berlin, Germany
- Coordinates: 52°31′12″N 13°22′10″E
- Current tenants: Friedrich Merz, Chancellor of Germany
- Construction started: February 4, 1997
- Completed: 2001

Height
- Height: 36 m (118 ft)

Technical details
- Floor count: 8
- Floor area: 64,413 m²

Design and construction
- Architects: Charlotte Frank; Axel Schultes
- Architecture firm: Schultes Frank Architekten

The Federal Chancellery (German: Bundeskanzleramt, pronounced [ˈbʊndəskant͡slɐˌʔamt͡]) is a government building in Berlin and headquarters of the federal agency of the same name, which supports the Federal Chancellor in his duties. As part of the move of the German Federal Government from Bonn to Berlin, the office moved into the new building planned by the architects Axel Schultes and Charlotte Frank. The building is part of the "Federal Ribbon" (German: Band des Bundes) in the Spreebogen. The Federal Chancellery is the largest government headquarters in the world and is approximately eight times larger than the White House in Washington.

== History ==
When the North German Confederation became the German Empire in 1871, the Confederation's Bundeskanzleramt (Federal Chancellery) was renamed to Reichskanzleramt (Reich Chancellery or Imperial Chancellery). It originally had its seat in the Radziwiłł Palace (also known as Reichskanzlerpalais), built by Prince Antoni Radziwiłł on Wilhelmstraße 77 in Berlin. More and more imperial offices were separated from the Reichskanzleramt, e.g. the Reichsjustizamt (Office for National Justice) in 1877. What remained of the Reichskanzleramt became in 1879 the Reichsamt des Innern (the home office).

In 1878, Imperial Chancellor Bismarck created a new office for the chancellor's affairs, the Reichskanzlei. It kept its name over the years, also in the republic since 1919. In 1938–39, the building Neue Reichskanzlei (New Reich Chancellery), designed by Albert Speer, was built; its main entrance was located at Voßstraße 6, while the building occupied the entire northern side of the street. It was damaged during World War II and later demolished by Soviet occupation forces.

In 1949, the Federal Republic was created. Bonn was made the provisional capital. Federal Chancellor Konrad Adenauer used the Museum Koenig for the first two months and then moved the Bundeskanzleramt into Palais Schaumburg until a new Chancellery building was completed in 1976.

Nearly ten years after the German reunification in 1990, in the summer of 1999, most of the German government moved back to Berlin. The Chancellery was temporarily housed in the former GDR State Council Building (Staatsratsgebäude) as the new Chancellery building was not yet finished at the time.

== Overview ==
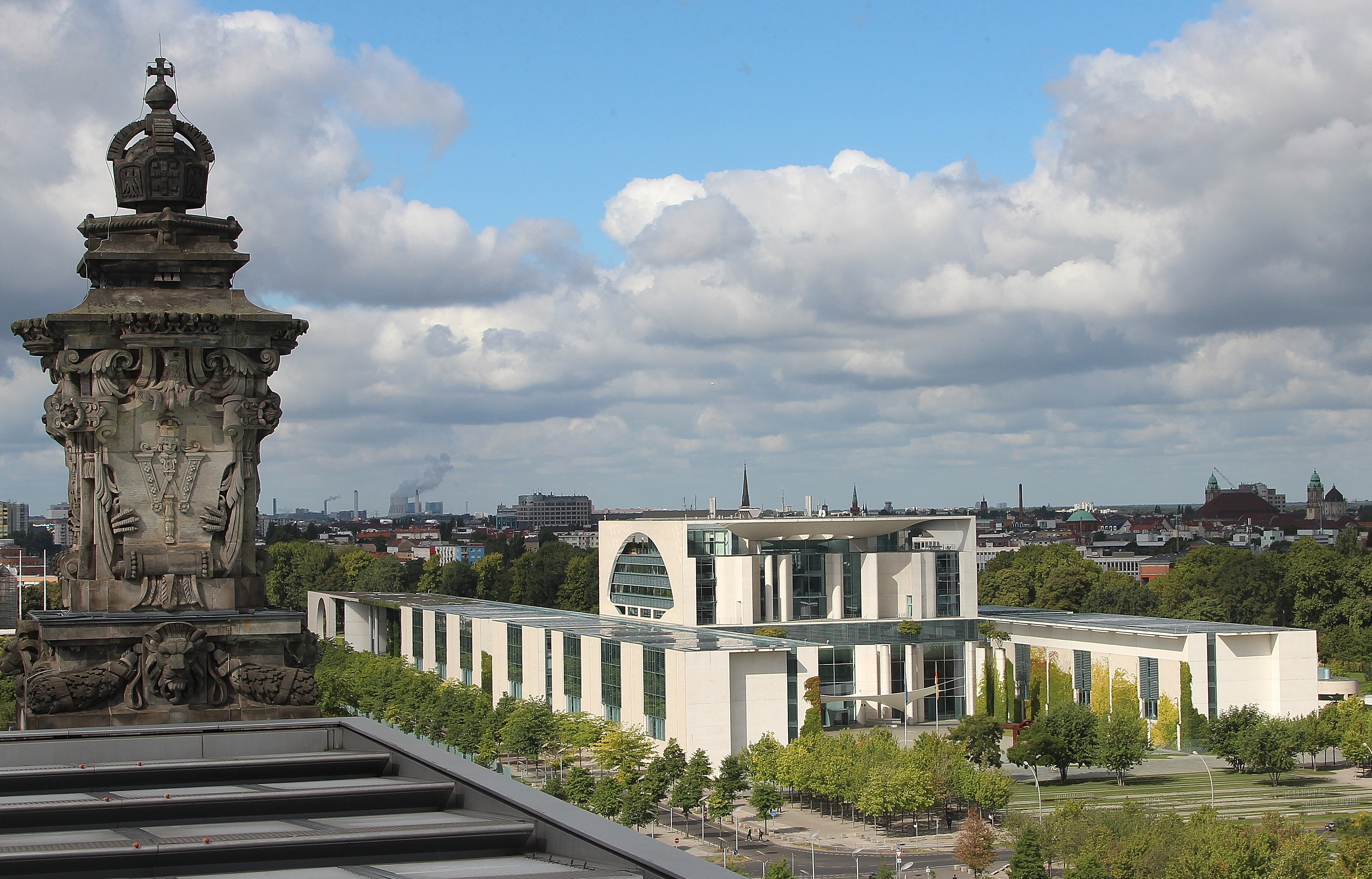
The Chancellery as seen from the nearby Reichstag building

The monumental building ensemble of the new Federal Chancellery was designed by the Berlin architects Axel Schultes and Charlotte Frank in a joint venture with Royal BAM Group's subsidiary Wayss & Freytag and the Spanish firm Acciona, during the term of Chancellor Helmut Kohl. After the ceremony on February 4, 1997, and four years of construction, the building was opened on 2 May 2001 by Chancellor Gerhard Schröder, completing the German government's move from Bonn to Berlin following reunification.

The building features a modern, largely glazed exterior and was constructed in an essentially postmodern style, though some elements of modernist style are evident. The design went through three versions between 1995 and 1997. Extensively used colors have their own, precisely defined symbolic effects. On the honorary court, which is formed by the line construction and the two office wings, there is the oxidized rust-red Berlin sculpture of the Spanish artist Eduardo Chillida, consisting of two abstract crossing hands as a symbol of German reunification, remotely reminding of Henry Moore's Large Two Forms in front of the old Federal Chancellery (Bonn). The central wing of the building itself is structured with four columns each with tree planting, in front of the main entrance is a spanning tent roof. Flagpoles are lined up in front of the building, where state guests are received with military honors.

It is considered the world's largest government headquarters, being around eight times the size of the White House in Washington DC. With a height of 36 meters, the building is higher than Berlin's "Traufhöhe" [de] of 22 meters.

The most important physical characteristics of the building complex include:

- Gross floor area 64,413 m^{2}
- Gross volume 283,646 m³˝
- Usable area 25,347 m^{2}
- Main usable area approx. 19,000 m^{2}
- Land, helipad, and chancellery park approx. 73,000 m^{2}

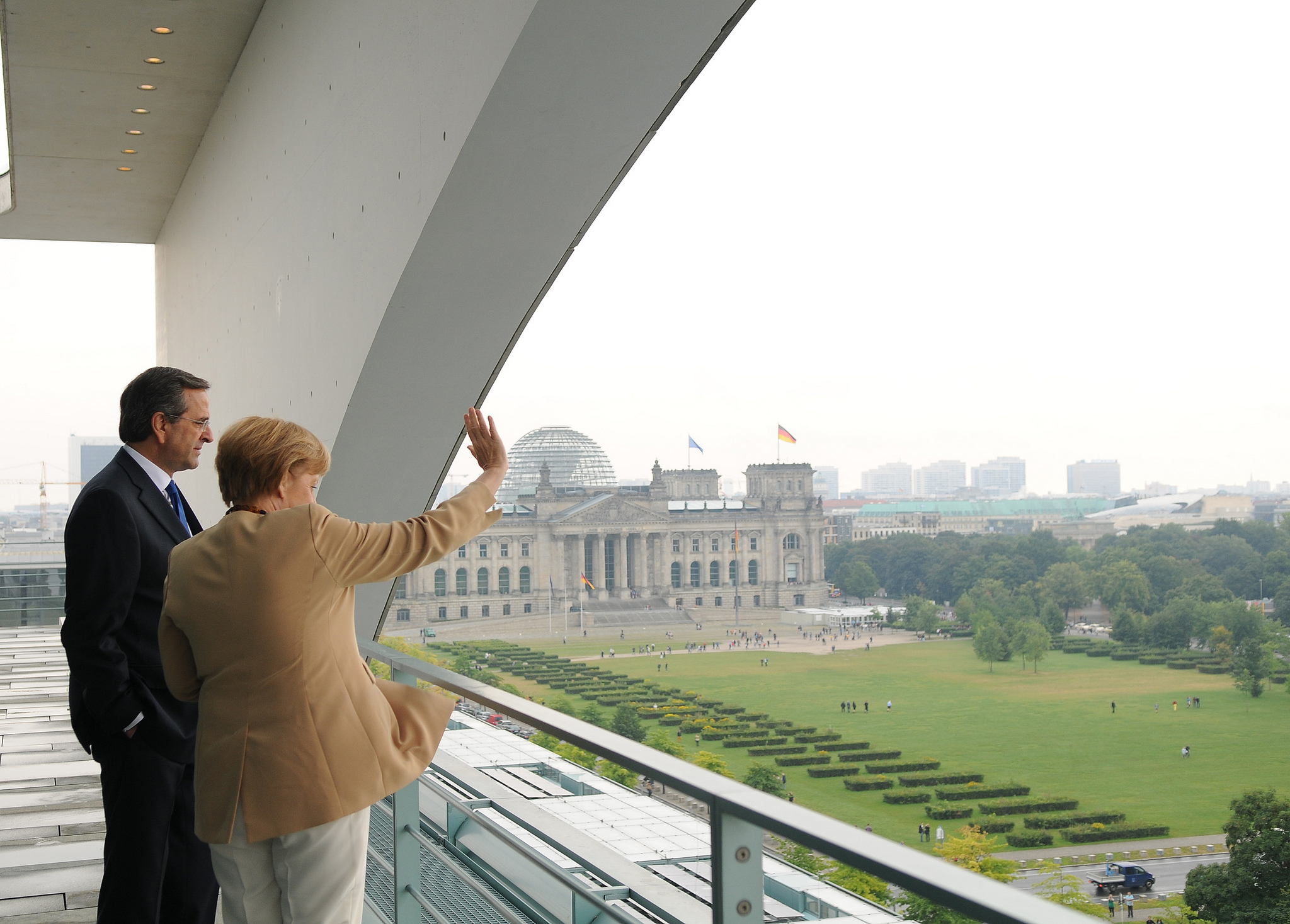
Chancellor Merkel welcomes Antonis Samaras, the Prime Minister of Greece, in the Chancellery, 2012.

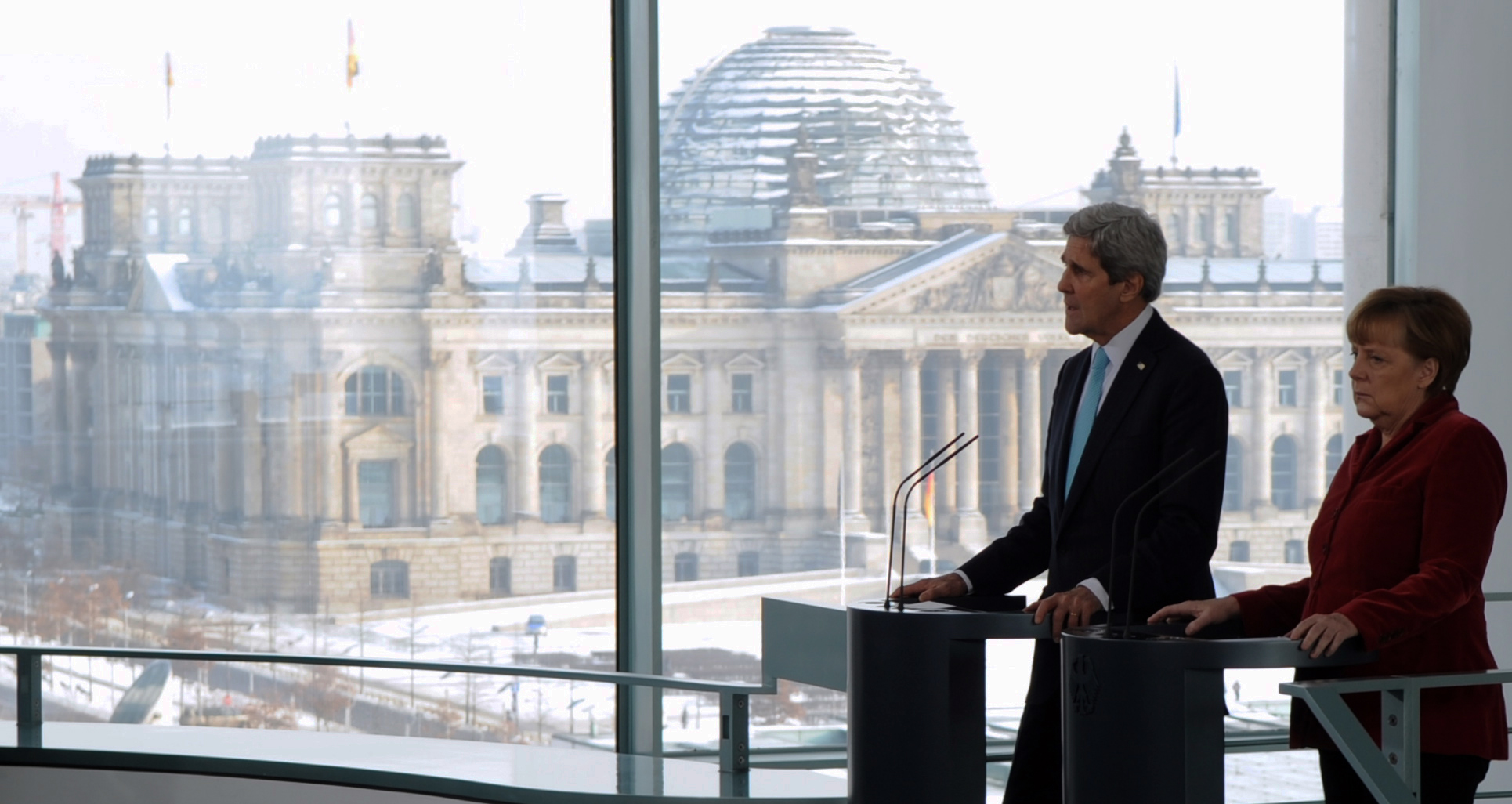
U.S. Secretary of State John Kerry and Chancellor Merkel address reporters in the Chancellery, 2014.

In the line construction, flanked by two office wings, there are nine levels:

- Ground floor: Foyer with a large staircase for photo sessions with guests.
- 1st floor: International conference room with 32 seats, interpreter booths and control rooms. Press briefing room with stage, seating for 200 journalists.
- 2nd and 3rd floor: technical and functional rooms (kitchen, wine cellar, flower fridge, etc.)
- 4th floor: "secret floor" with tap-proof room for the crisis staff, planning center and archive.
- 5th floor: Large banquet hall for receptions and banquets. Loggias to the east and west. Office of the Minister of State.
- 6th floor: Small Cabinet Hall with interpreter booths and Large Cabinet Hall. Office of the Minister of State.
- 7th floor: Office of the Federal Chancellor with windows towards the Reichstag building and Brandenburg Gate, and Office of the chancellery chief.
- Between 7th and 8th floor: "Skylobby".
- 8th floor: A semi-official Chancellor apartment, integrated kitchen and bedroom in the south. The 200 square meter two-room flat has thus far only been occupied by Gerhard Schröder. Office of the Minister of Culture in the north.

In the wings there are 300 offices of 20 m^{2} each and 13 winter gardens. In the southern office wing there is a canteen. In the northern office wing is the press and staff entrance next to the separate main police station. Beyond the Spree in the Chancellery Park to the west there is a helipad. The park is accessible via the Kanzleramtssteg, a double-storey bridge, for pedestrians and vehicles.

In addition to the possibility of electronic communication, there is also a pneumatic tube system for filing documents. The two line system has a length of 1.3 km and 36 stations. Around 1000 messages a month are transferred via the tube system. The shipments are usually urgent transactions that cannot be forwarded electronically or via courier service, for example because they are classified or must be signed in the original. In 2024 it was decided to keep the system in operation because it still provides the best protection against espionage.

Visitor groups are allowed, albeit under extremely high security standards, with entrance control similar to an international airport, with passport control, previously prepared and approved lists of names, and attendance of each group of visitors by BKA officials.

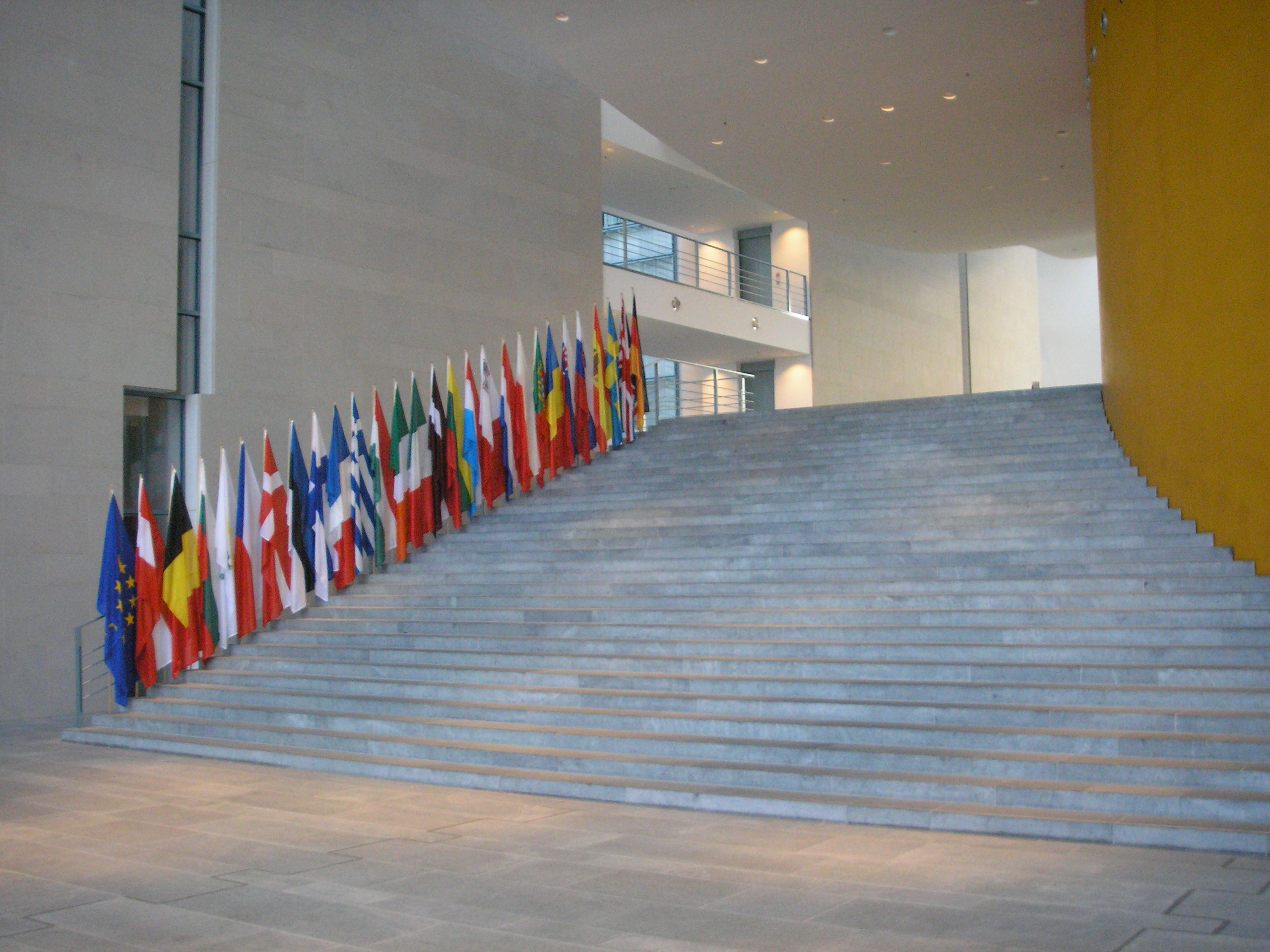
Staircase

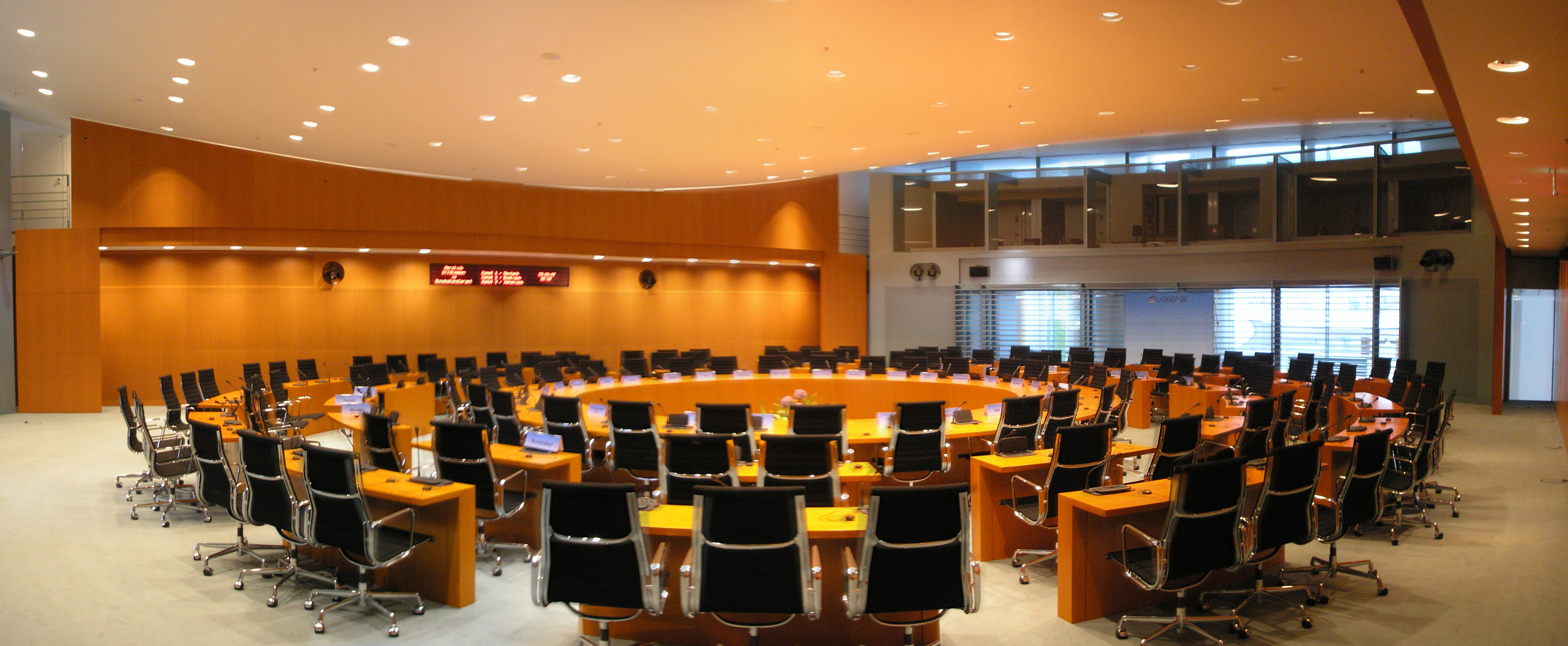
International Conference Hall (showing Eames Aluminum Group chairs)

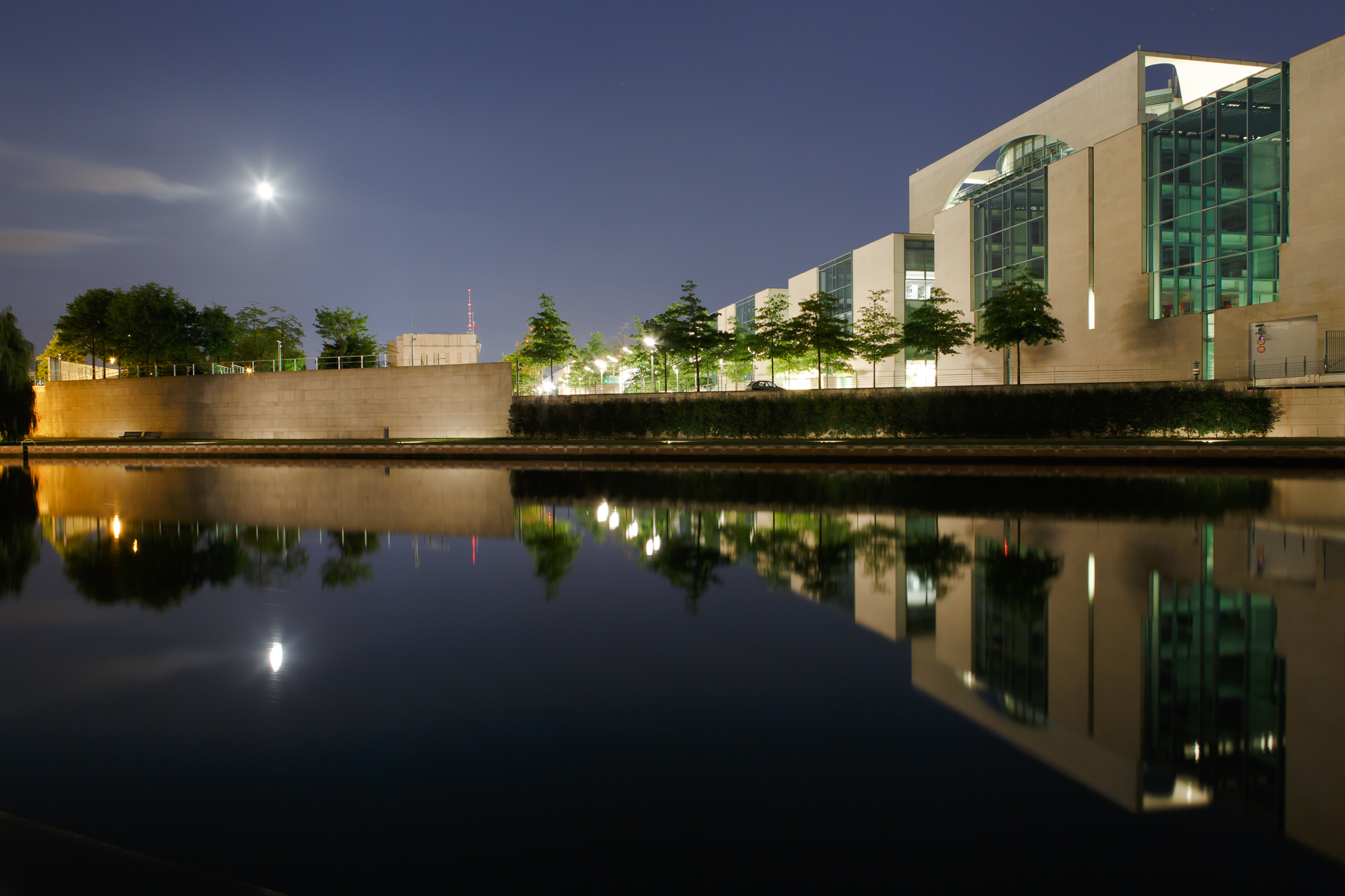
View across river Spree

== Art in the Chancellery ==
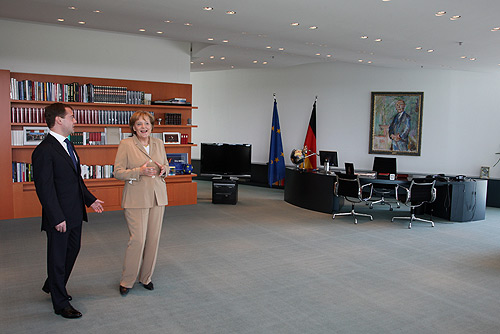
Angela Merkel with Dmitry Medvedev in her office, 2008; a painting of Konrad Adenauer by Oskar Kokoschka hangs above her desk

The Chancellery complex is not only home to important works of classical modernism, but also works by contemporary German and international artists.

The main work in the chancellery is the monumental iron sculpture Berlin by the Spanish sculptor Eduardo Chillida. The 5.5-metre-high and 87.5-ton sculpture, with its two almost touching arms, evokes associations such as rapprochement, division and unification, which can be understood as intended political symbolism. The sculpture occupies a similar position as Henry Moore's Large Two Forms at the Bonn Chancellery, and is of similar symbolism.

The inner entrance area was artistically shaped by the painter Markus Lüpertz, who transformed the central staircase into six different "colour spaces" whose colours are to symbolise certain classical virtues: blue (wisdom), umbra (as a lion's colour for power and strength), red (valour), ochre-gold (justice) and green/white (wisdom). In addition, Lüpertz created the sculpture The Philosopher as the epitome of thoughtful people, which is also located in the entrance area. Another large sculpture in the interior can be called the Great White Heading by the artist Rainer Kriester.

On the first floor is the gallery of the former federal chancellors. Helmut Schmidt had the idea of a portrait series in 1976. The former chancellors then chose a portrait, which was then purchased by the Chancellery:

Konrad Adenauer was painted by Hans Jürgen Kallmann in 1963. Another portrait of Adenauer by Oskar Kokoschka is in the office of the Chancellor. Ludwig Erhard and Kurt Georg Kiesinger were portrayed by Günter Rittner in the years 1974 and 1976.

Willy Brandt was originally portrayed by Georg Meistermann. Meistermann's picture represents a 'critical form' of the representative portrait, but reveals virtually no visible relation to the person and meaning of Brandt. The later Chancellor Helmut Schmidt, therefore, had the image removed from the Chancellery gallery, and his successor (from another party) Helmut Kohl replaced it with a realistically-painted Brandt portrait by the Düsseldorf painter Oswald Petersen.

Helmut Schmidt decided to let former East German artist Bernhard Heisig paint him in 1986. Helmut Kohl had himself painted by a student of Bernhard Heisig, Albrecht Gehse. Gerhard Schröder opted for a painting by Jörg Immendorff.

== Vernacular ==
Mainly by journalists and tourist guides, the building is being nicknamed "elephant loo", "Kohlosseum" (referring to former Chancellor Helmut Kohl) or Waschmaschine ("washing machine" or "laundry machine"). Sometimes "federal" or "Chancellor's laundry machine" are used also.

== See also ==
- Federal Chancellery (Bonn) – Former seat of national legislature of West Germany
- Reichstag building – Seat of the federal parliament of Germany
