= State Council Building =

- Staatsratsgebäude
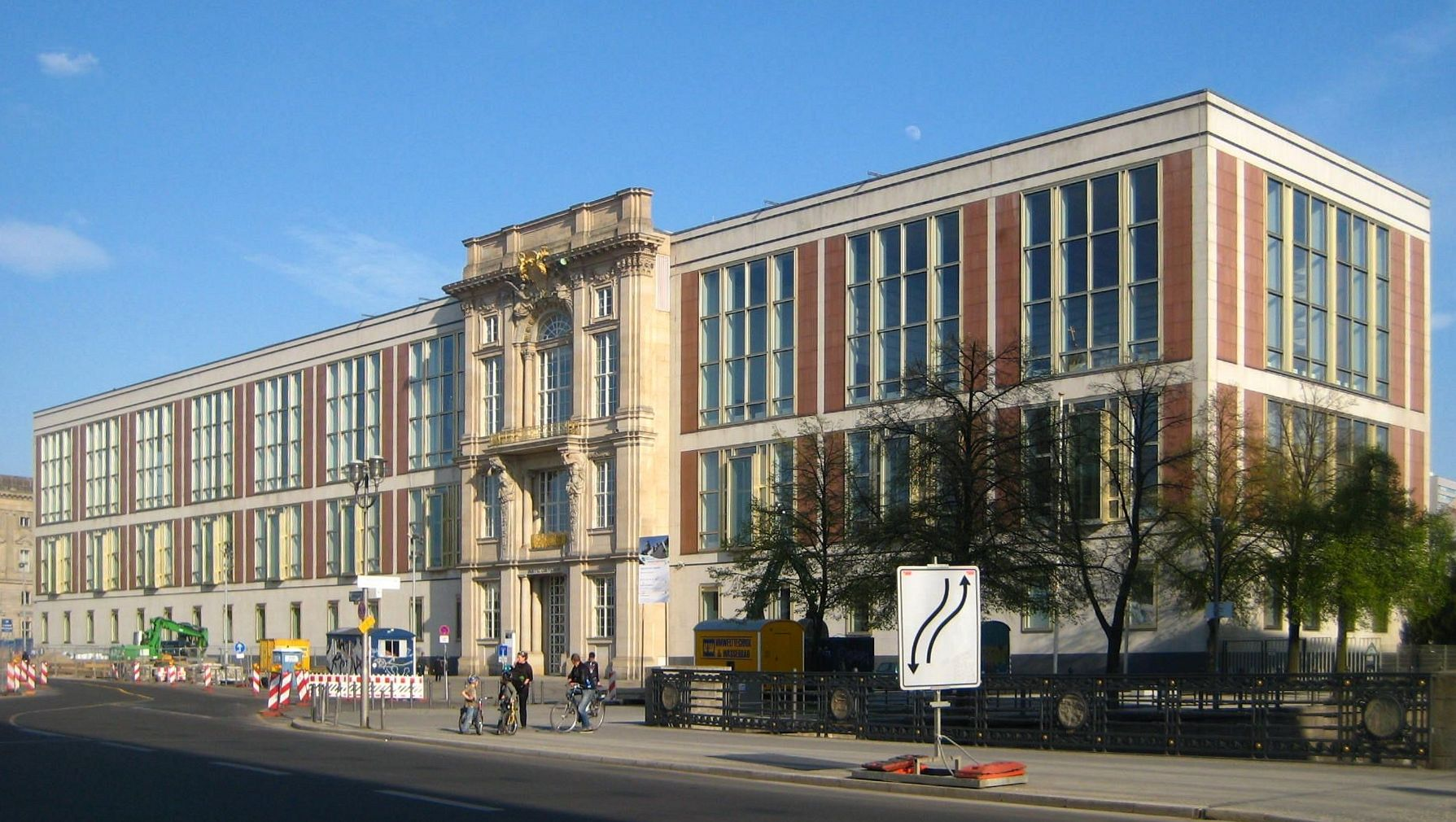
- The State Council Building in 2010.

- Location within Berlin

General information
- Status: Occupied by the European School of Management and Technology (ESMT Berlin)
- Type: Cultural building, Government building
- Architectural style: Modernist
- Location: Berlin, (Mitte), Germany
- Coordinates: 52°30′56″N 13°24′4″E
- Construction started: 1962
- Completed: 1964
- Inaugurated: 3 October 1964

Design and construction
- Architects: Roland Korn and Hans Erich Bogatzky

The State Council Building (German: Staatsratsgebäude) is a building in former East Berlin that hosted the State Council (German: Staatsrat), the collective head of state of the German Democratic Republic (East Germany or GDR), from 1964 to 1990.

== History ==
The building, which lies to the south of the Schloßplatz, was constructed from 1962 to 1964 by the architects Roland Korn and Hans Erich Bogatzky. It incorporates in its asymmetrical facade the Karl-Liebknecht-Portal (Portal IV), a fraction of the facade of the former Berlin Palace (Berliner Schloss) comprising the balcony from which Karl Liebknecht proclaimed a "Free Socialist Republic of Germany" on 9 November 1918, on the eve of the end of World War I, two hours after Social Democrat Philipp Scheidemann proclaimed the "Republic of Germany" from a window of the Reichstag building.

After the German reunification of 1990, the building temporarily accommodated the offices of the Federal Chancellor and the Federal Chancellery. This lasted from the move of the government from the Federal Chancellery in Bonn in 1999 until the inauguration of the new Chancellery in Berlin in 2001.

Since 2006, its premises are occupied by a higher education institution, the European School of Management and Technology (ESMT Berlin).

For the reconstruction of the Palace, a copy of the Portal IV was made and integrated into the new building.

== Gallery ==
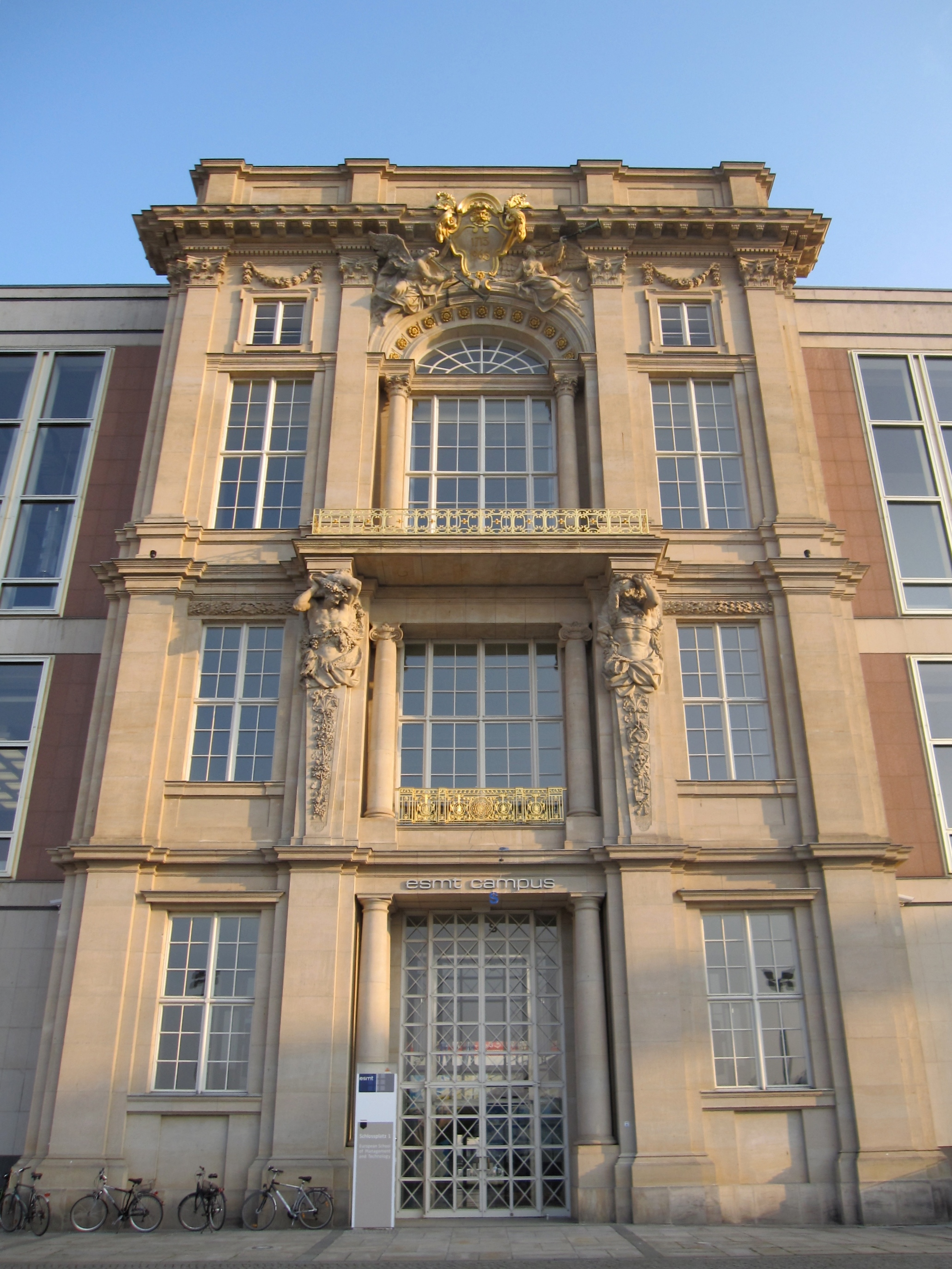
Portal IV.

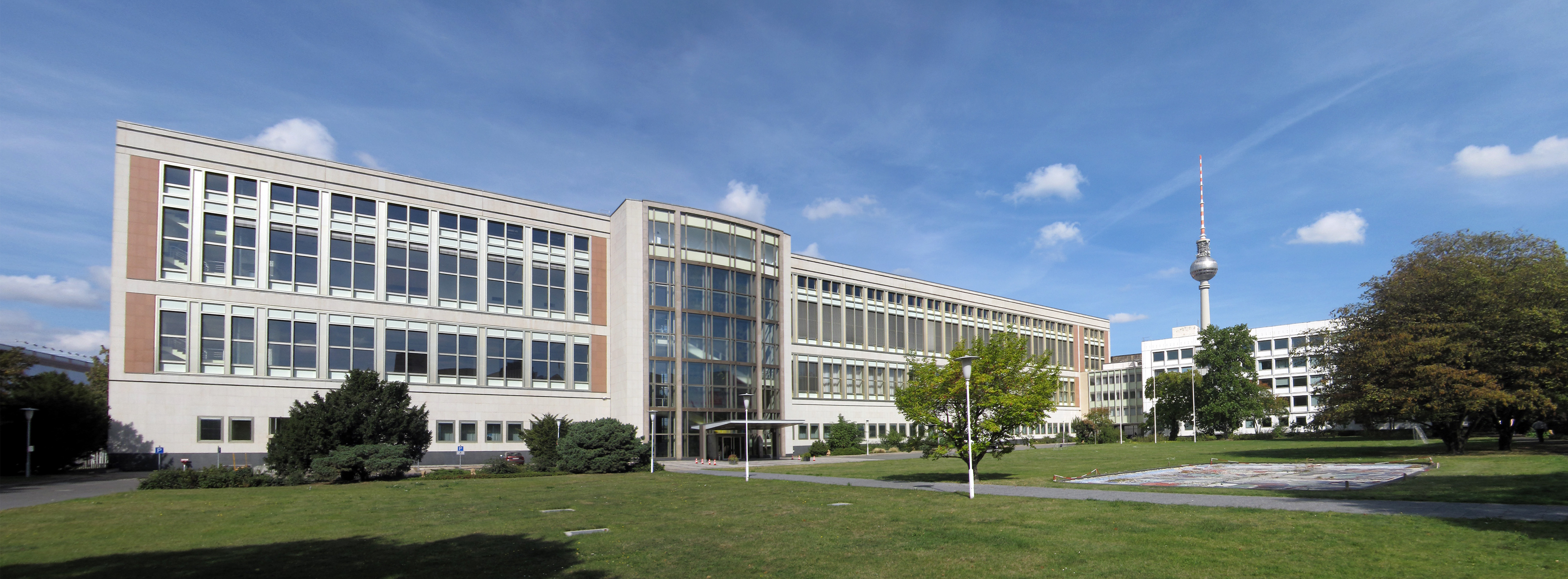
View from backyard.

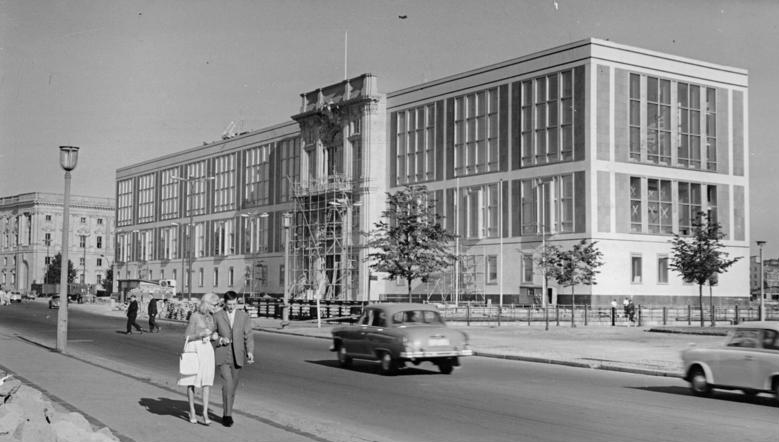
The State Council Building in 1964.

== See also ==
- Palace of the Republic, Berlin
