= Federal Chancellery of Germany =

Office of the Federal Chancellor of Germany

Coordinates: 52°31′13″N 13°22′09″E

Federal Chancellery
- Bundeskanzleramt

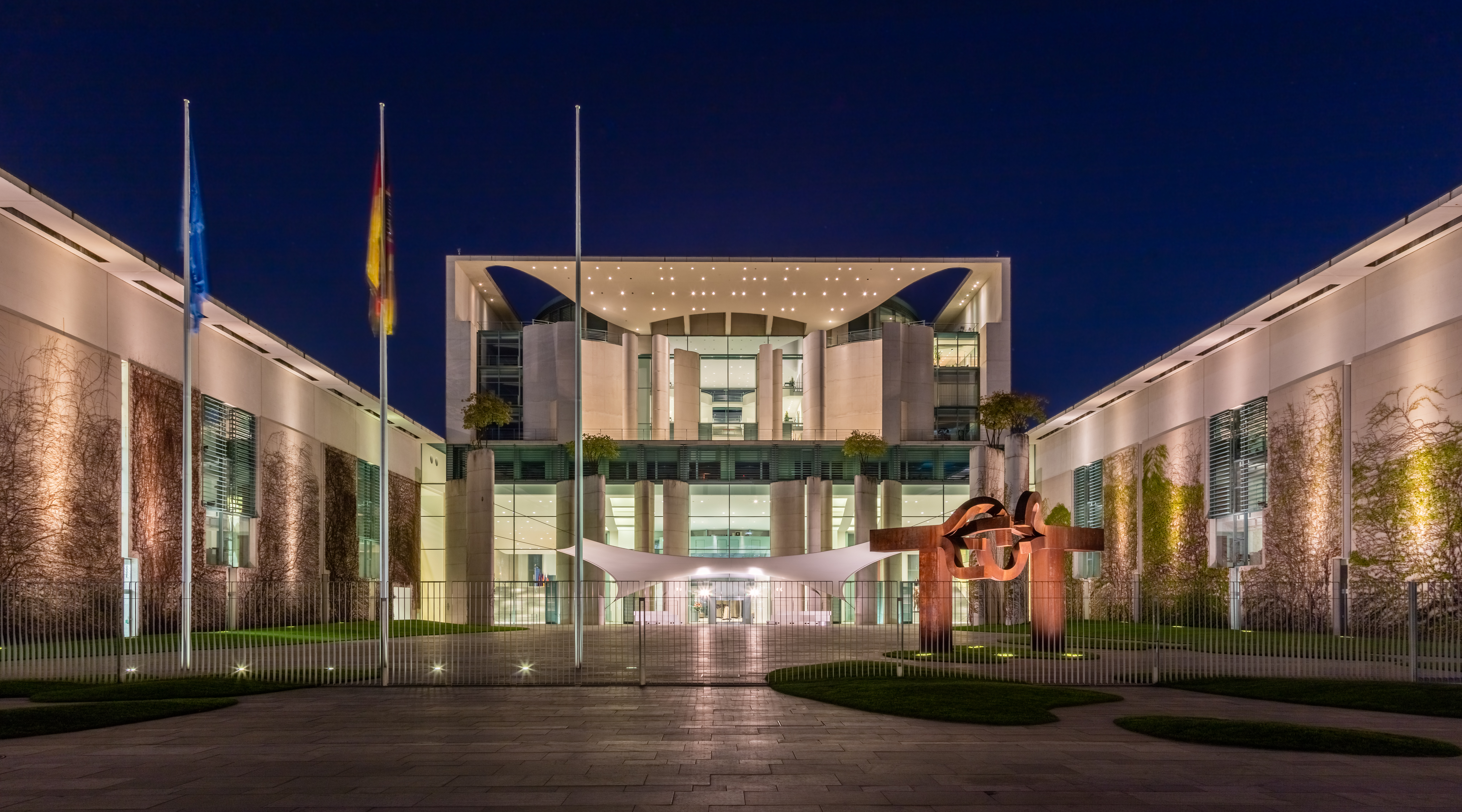

Agency overview
- Formed: 1949
- Jurisdiction: Government of Germany
- Headquarters: Federal Chancellery building, Berlin (primary) Bonn (secondary)
- Annual budget: €3.861 billion (2022)
- Agency executive: Nina Warken, Head of the Chancellery
- Website: bundesregierung.de

The Federal Chancellery (German: Bundeskanzleramt, pronounced [bʊndəsˈkant͡slɐˌʔamt]) is a German federal agency serving the executive office of the chancellor of Germany, the head of the federal government, currently Friedrich Merz. The Chancellery's primary function is to assist the chancellor in coordinating the activities of the federal government. The head of the Chancellery (Chef des Bundeskanzleramtes) holds the rank of either a Secretary of State (Staatssekretär) or a Federal Minister (Bundesminister), currently held by Nina Warken. The headquarters of the German Chancellery is at the Federal Chancellery building in Berlin, which is the largest government headquarters in the world.

== History ==
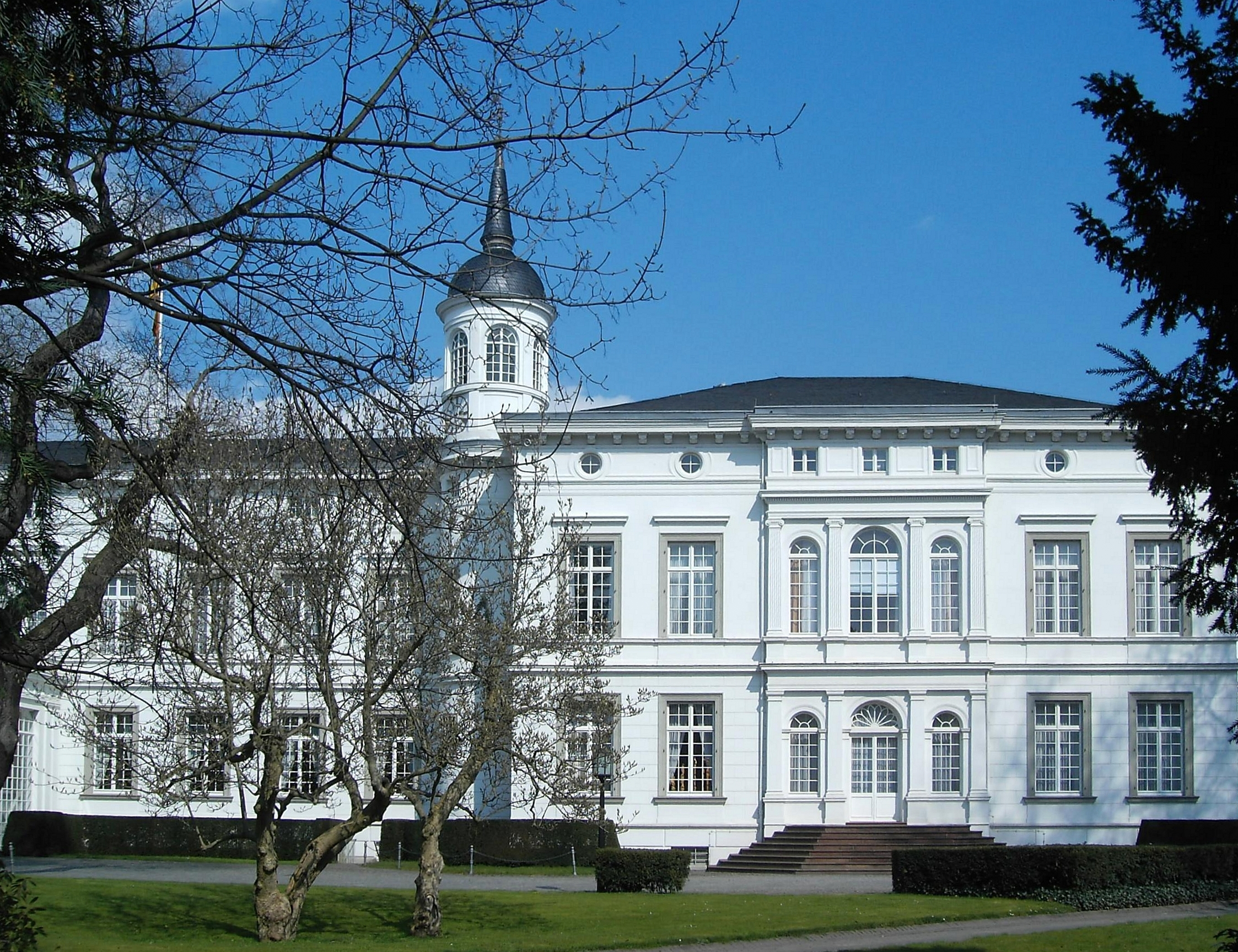
Palais Schaumburg, the Chancellery building in Bonn

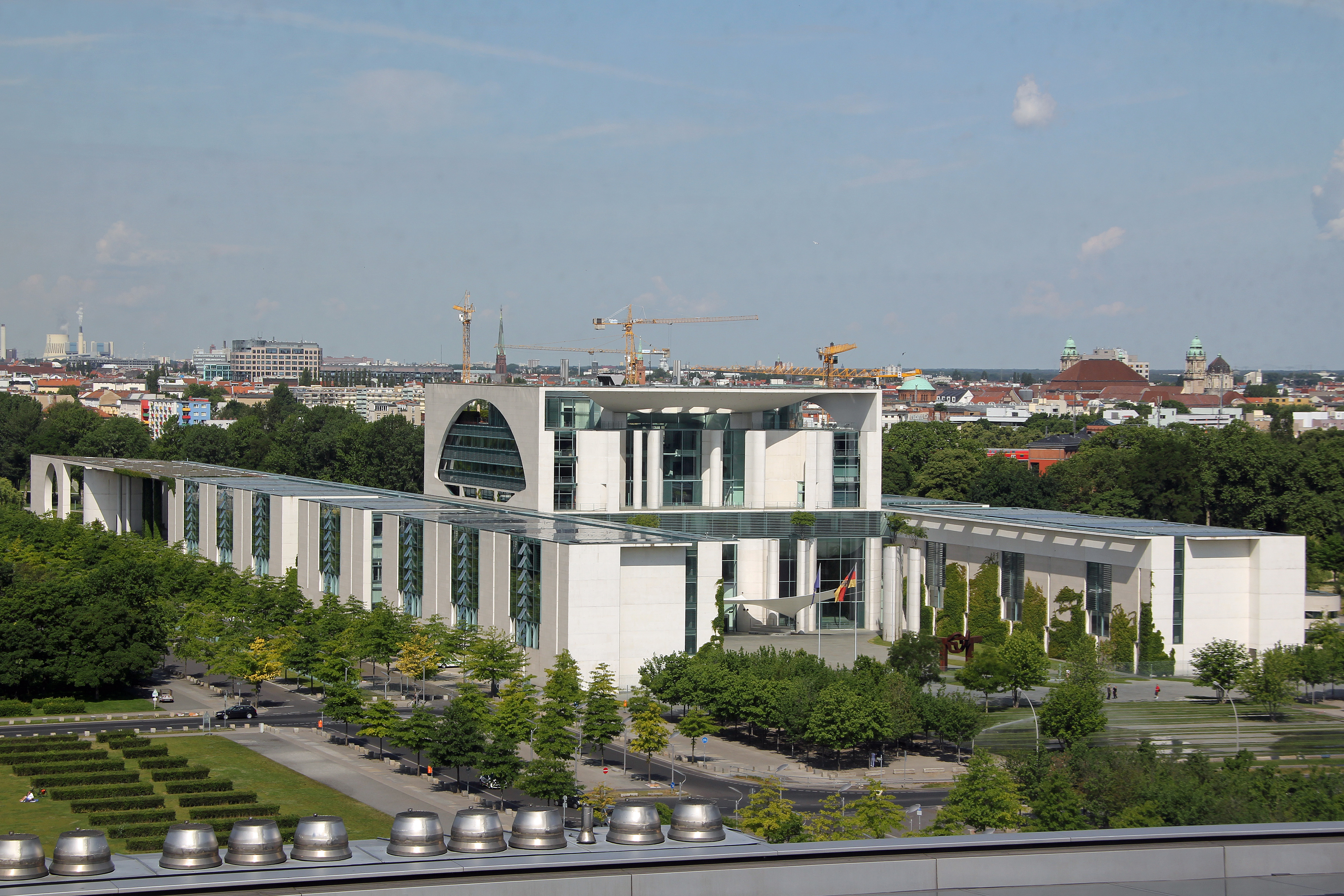
Chancellery in Berlin, view from the Reichstag

When the North German Confederation was created in 1867, the constitution mentioned only the Bundeskanzler as the responsible executive officer. There was no collegial government with ministers. Federal Chancellor Otto von Bismarck in the beginning only established a Bundeskanzleramt as his office. It was the only 'ministry' of the country until in early 1870 the Prussian foreign office became the North German foreign office. At that occasion, the Bundeskanzleramt lost some tasks to the foreign office.

=== Reichskanzleramt ===
When the North German Confederation became the German Empire in 1871, the Bundeskanzleramt was renamed to Reichskanzleramt. It originally had its seat in the Radziwiłł Palace (also known as Reichskanzlerpalais), originally built by Prince Antoni Radziwiłł on Wilhelmstraße 77 in Berlin. More and more imperial offices were separated from the Reichskanzleramt, e.g. the Reichsjustizamt (Office for National Justice) in 1877. What remained of the Reichskanzleramt became in 1879 the Reichsamt des Innern (the home office).

=== Reichskanzlei ===
In 1878 Imperial Chancellor Bismarck created a new office for the chancellor's affairs, the Reichskanzlei. It kept its name over the years, also in the republic since 1919. In 1938–39, the building Neue Reichskanzlei (New Imperial Chancellery), designed by Albert Speer, was built; its main entrance was located at Voßstraße 6, while the building occupied the entire northern side of the street. It was damaged during World War II and later demolished by Soviet occupation forces.

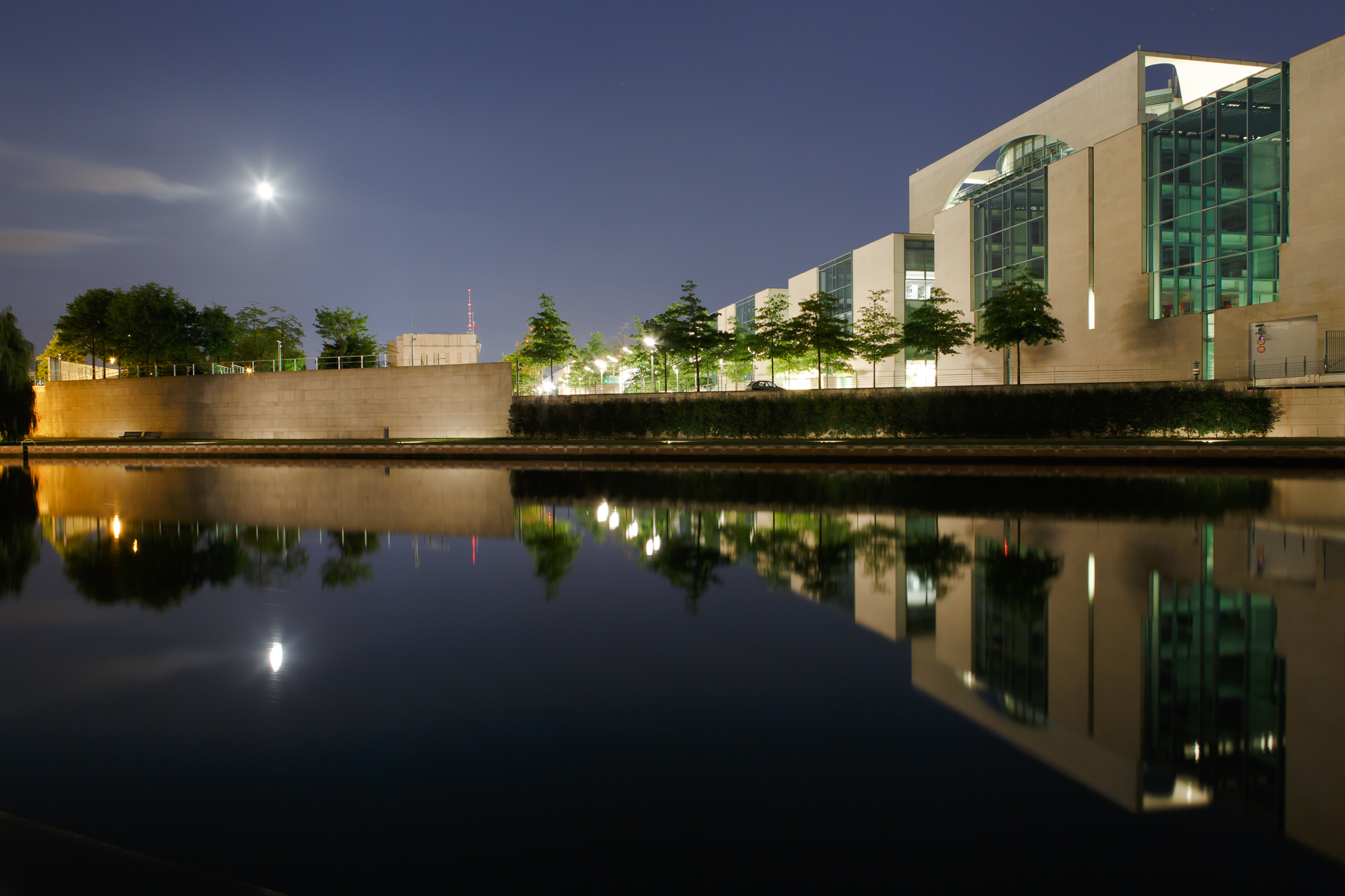
Nightly view on the Bundeskanzleramt

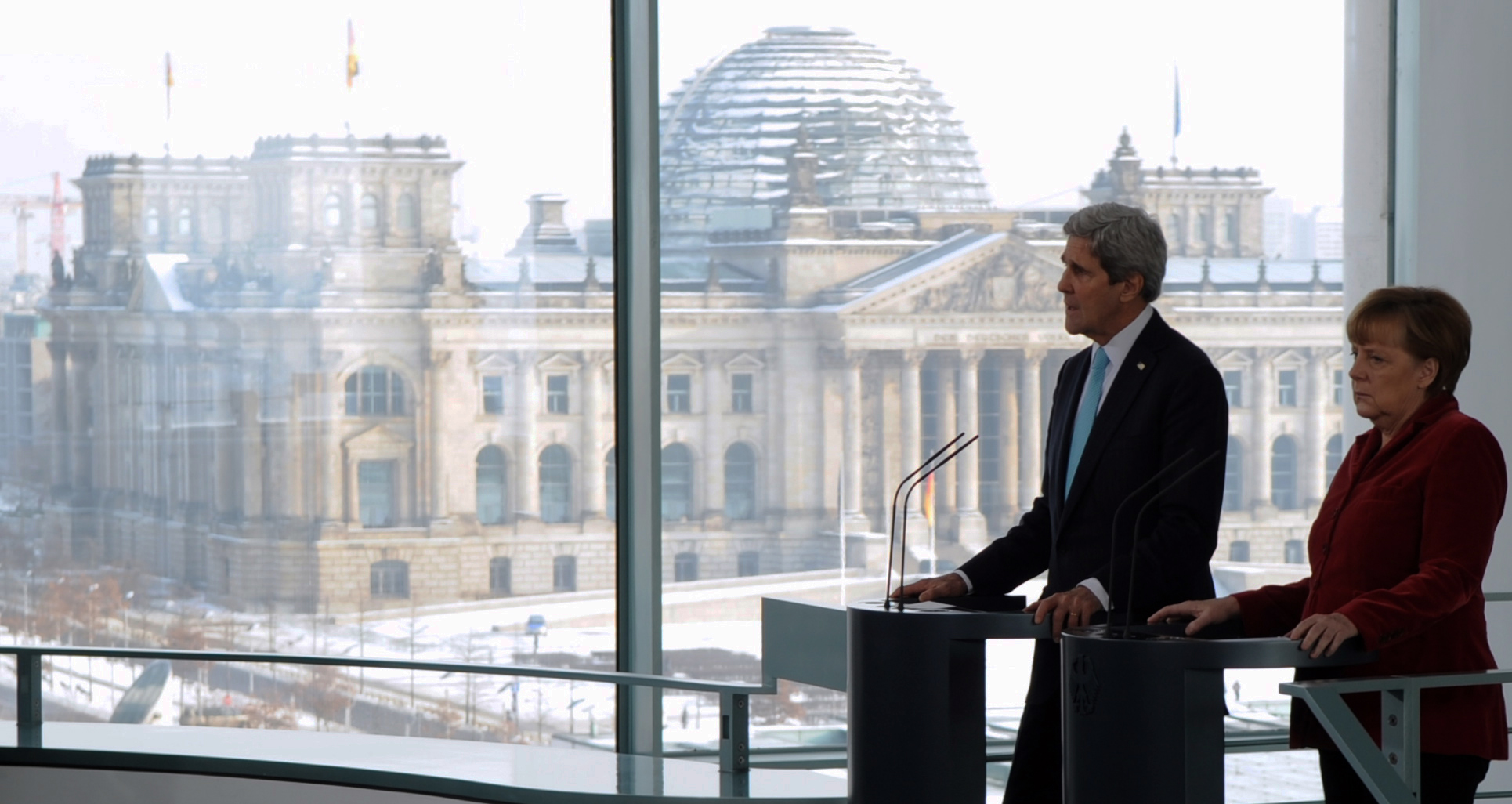
Press conference with Federal Chancellor Angela Merkel and view on the Reichstag building

=== Bundeskanzleramt ===
In 1949, the Federal Republic was created. Bonn was made the provisional capital. Federal Chancellor Konrad Adenauer used the Museum Koenig for the first two months and then moved the Bundeskanzleramt into Palais Schaumburg until a new Chancellery building was completed in 1976. The new West German Chancellery building was a black structure completed in the International Style, in an unassuming example of modernism.

In 1999, the headquarters of the Federal Chancellery were moved from Bonn to Berlin under the Berlin-Bonn Act, first into the Staatsratsgebäude, then in 2001 to the new building on the Spreebogen; since 2001 the secondary seat of the Federal Chancellery has been the Palais Schaumburg. A separate building, the Kanzlerbungalow served as private residence of the Chancellor and his family 1964–1999.

== Headquarters ==
Bundeskanzleramt is also the name of the building in Berlin that houses the personal offices of the chancellor and the Chancellery staff. Palais Schaumburg in Bonn is the secondary official seat of the German Federal Chancellery.

Opened in the spring of 2001, the current Chancellery building was designed by Charlotte Frank and Axel Schultes and was built by a joint venture of Royal BAM Group's subsidiary Wayss & Freytag and the Spanish Acciona Occupying 12,000 square meters (129,166 square feet), it is also the largest government headquarters building in the world. By comparison, the new Chancellery building is ten times the size of the White House.

Because of its distinctive but controversial architecture, journalists, tourist guides and some locals refer to the buildings as Kohllosseum (as a mix of Colosseum and former chancellor Helmut Kohl under whom it was built), Bundeswaschmaschine (federal laundry machine, because of the round-shaped windows and its cubic form), or Elefantenklo (elephant loo).

Access for the general public is only possible on particular days during the year. Since 1999, the German government has welcomed the general public for one weekend per year to visit its buildings – usually in August.

== Heads of the Chancellery ==
Heads of the German Chancellery (Chef des Bundeskanzleramts, ChefBK) attend Cabinet meetings. They may also sit as members of the Cabinet if they are also given the position of Minister for Special Affairs (Minister für besondere Aufgaben). They are often called "Kanzleramtsminister" (chancellery minister). Otherwise, they have the rank of a secretary of state (comparable to a minor or vice minister in other countries).

The current Head of the Chancellery is Nina Warken, the first woman to hold the position.

Typically a ChefBK is a very close advisor of the chancellor, being the primary contact to the cabinet ministers. Many of them became cabinet ministers (with other portfolios) themselves, several ministers of the interior. Frank Walter Steinmeier who served as minister of the chancery under Schröder (1999–2005) later served as minister of foreign affairs (2005–2009 and 2013–2017) candidate for chancellor (2009) leader of the opposition (2009-2013) and ultimately in the largely ceremonial role of federal president (2017–).

== See also ==
- Berlin Police
- German Chancery Deutsche Kanzlei - government agency located in London during the reign of the Hanoverian kings in the UK
- Wachbataillon
