= Hubertus von Pilgrim =

German sculptor and printmaker (1931–2026)

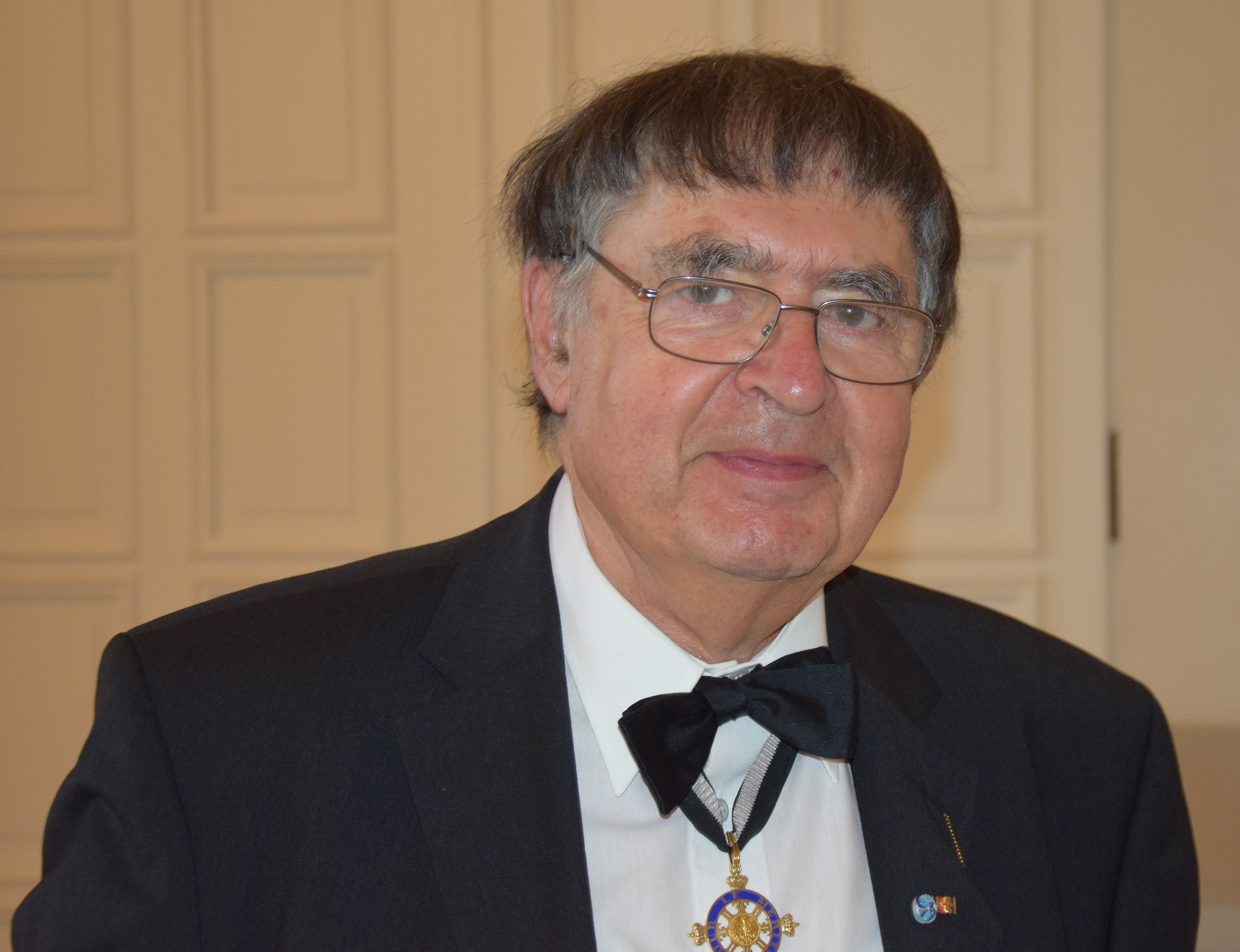
Hubertus von Pilgrim (2014)

Hubertus von Pilgrim (24 August 1931 – 1 January 2026) was a German artist who lived and worked in Pullach, near Munich as a sculptor, printmaker and medallist. He has work in the collections of the Brooklyn Museum and Art Institute of Chicago. Von Pilgrim was Vice-Chancellor of the Pour le Mérite from 2009 to 2013.

== Life and career ==
Von Pilgrim was born in Berlin on 24 August 1931. He studied art history, literature, and philosophy at the University of Heidelberg from 1951 to 1954 while simultaneously being taught sculpture by Erich Heckel. From 1954 to 1960 he studied sculpture under Bernhard Heiliger at the Hochschule der Künste in Berlin. He also studied copperplate printing with Stanley William Hayter in Paris.

He taught at Hochschule für Bildende Künste Braunschweig from 1963 to 1977, then from 1977 he was a professor at the Academy of Fine Arts, Munich until 1995.

Von Pilgrim died in Pullach on 1 January 2026, at the age of 94.

== Notable works ==
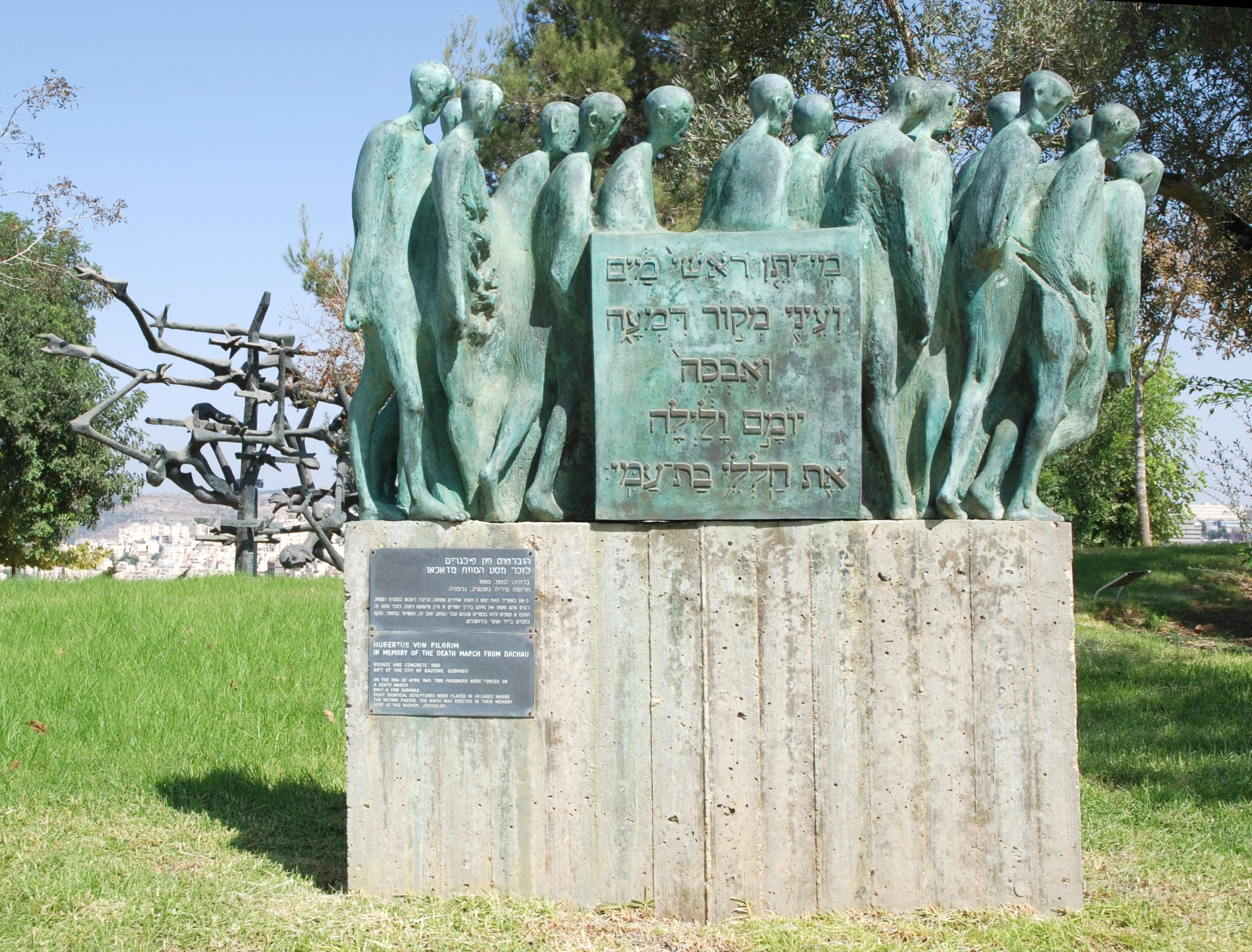
Mahnmal Todesmarsch, Yad Vashem

- Sculptures for the former Dachau concentration camp, including markers for the route of the death march and relief sculptures for Helmut Striffler's chapel
- A head of Konrad Adenauer, outside Palais Schaumburg, Bonn, which according to Sergiusz Michalski draws on Mexican statuary influenced by Toltec monuments while adding a more expressionistic quality

== Awards and honours ==
- 1995: Pour le Mérite
- 1997: Knight Commander's Cross of the Order of Merit of the Federal Republic of Germany
- 2005: Bavarian Order of Merit
- 2008: Johann Veit Döll medal

== Bibliography ==
- Pilgrim, Hubertus von; Kunstverein Göttingen (1969). Hubertus von Pilgrim – Kupferstiche (in German). Göttingen: Kunstverein Göttingen. OCLC 1393629677.
- Pilgrim, Hubertus von; Herzogenrath, Wulf; Städtisches Kunsthaus (Bielefeld, Germany); Pfalzgalerie Kaiserslautern (1967). Hubertus von Pilgrim. Graphik und Plastik. [Ausstellung.] Städtisches Kunsthaus Bielefeld, 4. Dez. 1966-7. Jan. 1967, Pfalzgalerie Kaiserslautern, 21. Jan.-15. Feb. 1967. (Katalog bearbeitun: Wulf Herzogenrath.) (in German). Bielefeld, Kaiserslautern: Städtisches Kunsthaus; Pfalzgalerie. OCLC 8677705.
- Pilgrim, Hubertus von; Städtisches Museum Braunschweig (1977). Hubertus von Pilgrim : Städtisches Museum Braunschweig; Ausstellung vom 30. Januar bis 27. Februar 1977 (in German). Braunschweig: Städt. Museum. OCLC 313536857.
- Pilgrim, Hubertus von; Axiom, Galerie für Moderne Kunst (1976). Hubertus von Pilgrim Plastiken, Kupferstiche, Lithographien; [Ausstellung vom 29.10.1976 bis 31.12.1976] (in German). Köln: Verl. der Galerie Axiom. OCLC 1532663660.
- Pilgrim, Hubertus von; Ausstellung (1977). Hubertus von Pilgrim ; Gustav-Lübcke-Museum Hamm. Ausstellung vom 9. Okt. bis 6. Nov. 1977 (in German). OCLC 252407935.
- Pilgrim, Hubertus von (1990). Hubertus von Pilgrim Plastiken und Kupferstiche; Ausstellung in der Bayerischen Vertretung Bonn, 13.12.90 – 6.1.91 (in German). Bonn: [Verlag nicht ermittelbar]. OCLC 1411554827.
