= Decision on the Capital of Germany =

1991 German Bundestag resolution

The capital resolution (German: Hauptstadtbeschluss) was made by the German Bundestag on 20 June 1991, as a result of German reunification, to move its headquarters, as well as the headquarters of half the federal ministries, from Bonn to Berlin. Ministries which remained in Bonn, such as the Federal Ministry of Defence, established secondary offices in Berlin; likewise the seats in Bonn turned to second offices for ministries which moved to Berlin.

Berlin had officially become the capital of the Federal Republic of Germany in 1990 as one of the stipulations of the Unification Treaty, and the resolution was to make it the seat of government as well.

== Decision and implementation ==
=== Background and vote ===
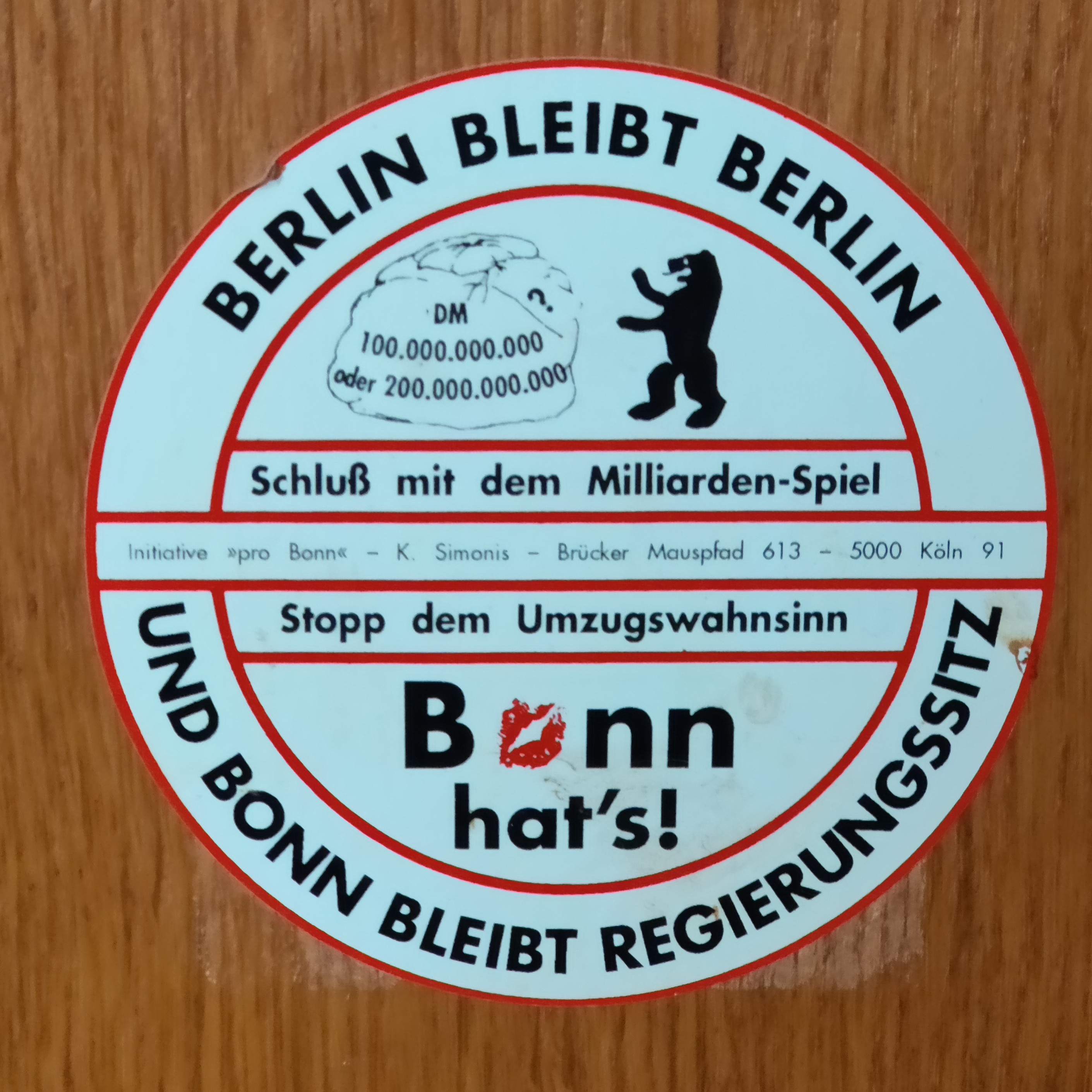
A sticker supporting Bonn as the seat of government. The text reads: "Bonn has it! Berlin remains Berlin and Bonn remains the seat of government. Stop the game of billions [of DM]. (Note: Literally: "milliards" (see Long and short scales).) Stop the relocation madness."

With the reunification of Germany, the newly reunified Berlin became Germany's capital once again, a status it had held from the foundation of Germany 1871 to the fall of Nazi Germany 1945. However, the seat of government remained in Bonn, which had been the "provisional" capital of West Germany from 1949 to 1990. There was some sentiment in favour of keeping the seat of government in Bonn, which would have created a situation analogous to that of the Netherlands, where Amsterdam is the capital but The Hague is the seat of government. Not only were there concerns about Berlin's past connection to Nazi Germany, but Bonn was closer to Brussels, headquarters of the European Communities. Bonn was also located in Germany's wealthiest and most densely populated region, while the former East German states surrounding Berlin were economically depressed and relatively sparsely populated.

The proposal "Completion of the Unity of Germany", with the content of establishing the future seat of government in Berlin, had been formulated and introduced by prominent members of parliament across party lines. These included members of the SPD (Willy Brandt, Hans-Jochen Vogel, Wolfgang Thierse), the FDP (Burkhard Hirsch, Hermann Otto Solms, Rainer Ortleb), the CDU/CSU (Günther Krause, Wolfgang Schäuble, Oscar Schneider) and Alliance 90 (Wolfgang Ullmann).

After more than ten hours of discussion, the Bundestag voted 338 to 320 to pass the bill "Vollendung der Einheit Deutschlands" (English: completion of the unification of Germany). Due to an initial error, the initial count stood at 337 to 320, but the number of yes votes was later determined to be 338. The vote broke largely along regional lines, with legislators from the south and west favouring Bonn and legislators from the north and east voting for Berlin. Of the 328 directly elected deputies, 169 voted for Bonn and 153 for Berlin. Of the deputies elected via the regional lists, 185 were for Berlin and 151 for Bonn. The vote also broke along generational lines; older legislators with memories of Berlin's past glory favoured Berlin, while younger legislators favoured Bonn. Ultimately, the votes of the eastern German legislators tipped the balance in favour of Berlin.

Voting behaviour of the members of parliament elected in the constituencies in the Bundestag elections on 20 June 1991: for Berlin (153) for Bonn (169) no participation or replacement by successors (6)

Votes cast by party affiliation
| Party | For Berlin | | For Bonn | |
| Party | Votes | Percent | Votes | Percent |
|---|---|---|---|---|
| CDU | 146 | 54.1 | 124 | 45.9 |
| CSU | 8 | 16.7 | 40 | 83.3 |
| SPD | 110 | 46.6 | 126 | 53.4 |
| FDP | 53 | 67.1 | 26 | 32.9 |
| Bü90 | 4 | 66.7 | 2 | 33.3 |
| PDS | 17 | 94.5 | 1 | 5.5 |
| Independent | 0 | 0 | 1 | 100 |
| Total | 338 | 51.5 | 320 | 48.5 |

=== Implementation ===
As a result of this decision, many subsequent motions were passed at different levels of government to ease the transition of the German capital to Berlin. To guarantee "fair division of labour" between the cities, it was decided to move the following government offices to Berlin, whilst retaining a secondary, smaller office in Bonn:

- Chancellor's Office
- Federal Press Office
- Foreign Office
- Federal Ministry of the Interior
- Federal Ministry of Finance
- Federal Ministry of Justice
- Federal Ministry of Economics and Technology
- Federal Ministry of Labour and Social Affairs
- Federal Ministry of Transport, Building and Urban Development
- Federal Ministry of Family Affairs, Senior Citizens, Women and Youth

The following federal ministries were to remain in Bonn, each with a second office in Berlin:

- Federal Ministry of Food, Agriculture and Consumer Protection
- Federal Ministry of Defence
- Federal Ministry of Health
- Federal Ministry for Environment, Nature Conservation and Nuclear Safety
- Federal Ministry for Education and Research
- Federal Ministry for Economic Cooperation and Development
- Federal Ministry of Posts and Telecommunications (dissolved 1998)

The Berlin-Bonn Act was passed in 1994. Originally, the federal ministries' move to Berlin was planned for 1995, however this deadline was not adhered to. Instead a Cabinet decision was made that the move should be completed by 2000, on a budget of no more than 20 billion DM (10.2 billion EUR).

During this period other fundamental decisions were made, including:

- the Reichstag building is the permanent seat of the Bundestag
- the majority of the federal ministries will move to Berlin
- the majority of ministerial jobs will remain in Bonn
- each federal minister in Bonn and Berlin will have a second seat in the other city
- the Federal President has his office in Berlin

Berlin officially adopted its full role as the home of the parliament and government of the Federal Republic of Germany in July 1999. The German constitution was amended in 2006 to explicitly state that Berlin is the capital of Germany.

== See also ==
- Berlin-Bonn Act
- Bonn § 20th century and the "Bonn Republic"
- History of Berlin

== Literature ==
- Andreas Salz: Bonn-Berlin. Die Debatte um Parlaments- und Regierungssitz im Deutschen Bundestag und die Folgen. Monsenstein und Vannerdat, Münster 2006, ISBN 3-86582-342-4 (zugleich: Bonn, Univ., Magisterarbeit).
