= Charlotte Frank =

German architect

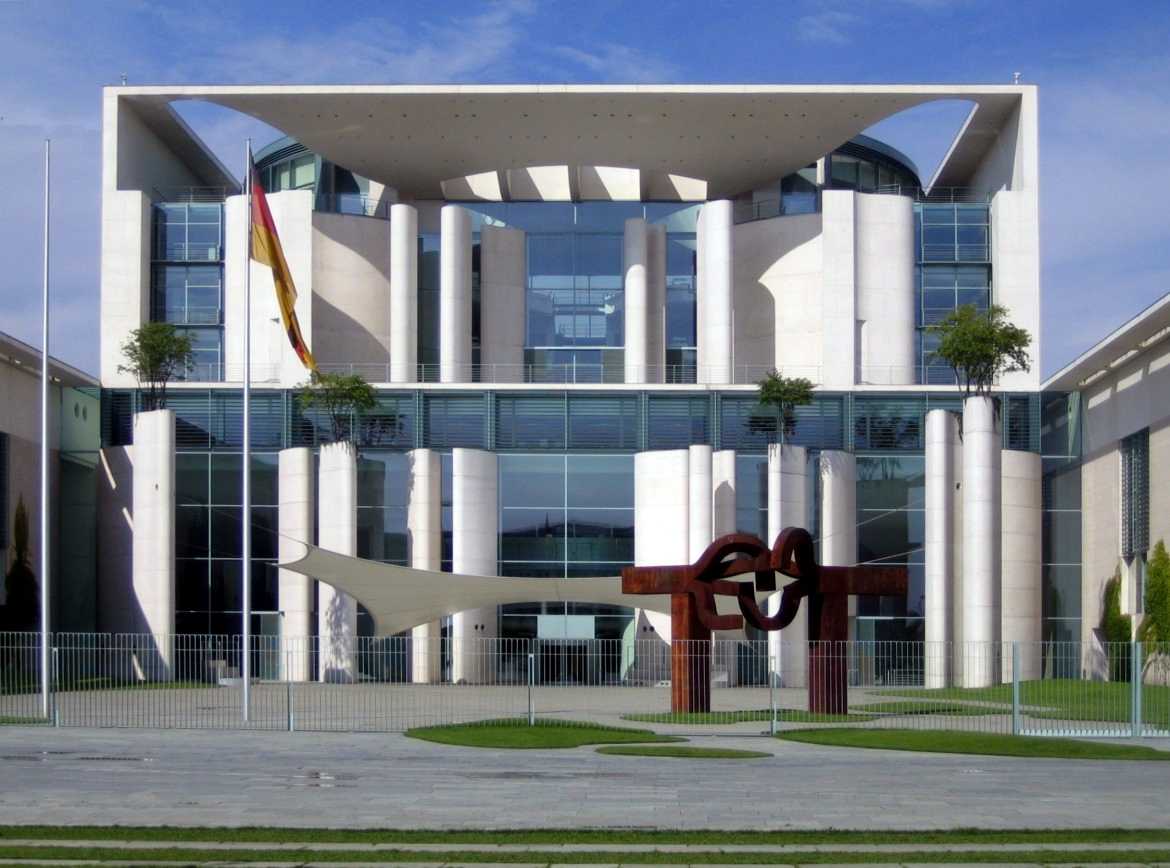
German Chancellery, Berlin

Charlotte Frank (born 25 July 1959, Kiel) is a German architect and partner at Schultes Frank Architekten in Berlin. In 2003, together with others, she was awarded the German Architecture Prize for the new Federal Chancellery in Berlin. She has worked with Axel Schultes on other projects, including the Kunstmuseum Bonn (1992).

== Completed works ==
- Federal Chancellery, Berlin

== Reception ==
- German Architecture Prize for the new German Chancellery in Berlin.

== Literature ==
- Mönninger, Michael, and Charlotte Frank. Kanzleramt Berlin = Chancellery Berlin. Edited by Axel Menges, Stuttgart, 2002. ISBN 3-930698-89-7.
- Schultes, Axel, and Max Bächer. Kunstmuseum Bonn. Ernst und Sohn, 1994. ISBN 3-433-02425-1.
