= Berlin-Bonn Act =

1994 German law on government relocation

Berlin/Bonn Act (Berlin/Bonn-Gesetz)
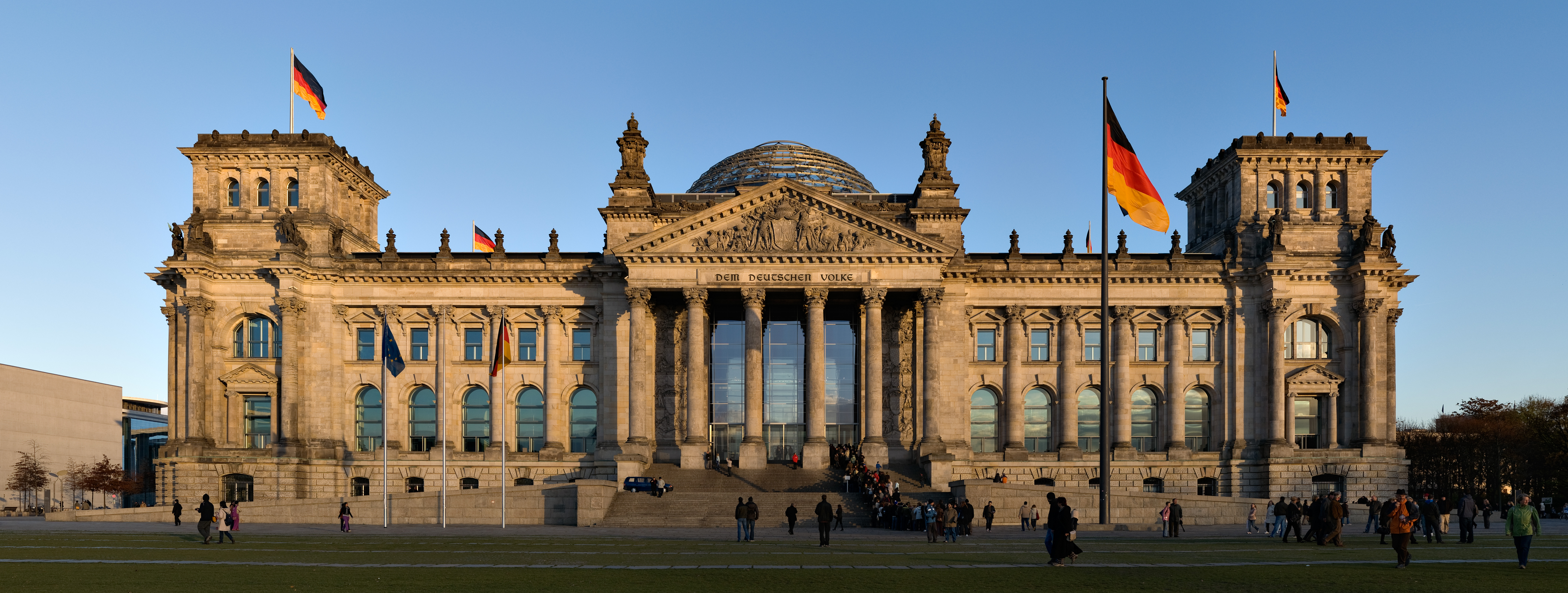

Bundestag
- Long title: Act for the implementation of the enactment of the German Bundestag of 20 June 1991 for the completion of the German unity (Gesetz zur Umsetzung des Beschlusses des Deutschen Bundestages vom 20. Juni 1991 zur Vollendung der Einheit Deutschlands)
- Citation: Federal Law 27 of 26 April 1994, p. 918 (BGBl. I S. 918)
- Enacted by: Bundestag
- Enacted: 26 April 1994

Related legislation
- Decision on the Capital of Germany
- Status: Amended

The Berlin/Bonn Act (German: Berlin/Bonn-Gesetz) regulated the move of the Bundestag and parts of the government of Germany from Bonn to Berlin. It also regulated the move of certain Federal agencies and other German federal facilities to Bonn. The act was a consequence of the Hauptstadtbeschluss (English: Enactment regarding the capital) of 20 June 1991, which made Berlin the seat of government. Berlin had already been the capital of the united Germany since the Unification Treaty of 3 October 1990. The Berlin/Bonn Act was enacted on 26 April 1994. The act's full official title is Act for the implementation of the enactment of the German Bundestag of 20 June 1991 for the completion of the German unity (German: Gesetz zur Umsetzung des Beschlusses des Deutschen Bundestages vom 20. Juni 1991 zur Vollendung der Einheit Deutschlands).

The Berlin/Bonn act determined which federal ministries moved to the capital and gave the city certain commitments regarding the preservation of Bonn as a location of politics. In addition, it awarded the city the unique title of the Federal City (German: Bundesstadt).

The act was implemented incrementally. The most important year was 1999, when the Bundestag moved to the Reichstag building in Berlin. At the same time, the Federal Court of Auditors and the Federal Cartel Office moved from Berlin and the Rhine-Main area to Bonn. Finally, the Bundesrat moved to Berlin in 2000.

== Federal agencies that moved ==
The following are examples of federal facilities that moved to Bonn (in total: 22):

- Bundesanstalt für Landwirtschaft und Ernährung from Frankfurt am Main (established in 1995 by merging the Bundesanstalt für landwirtschaftliche Marktordnung and the Bundesamt für Ernährung und Forstwirtschaft)
- Federal Institute for Drugs and Medical Devices from Berlin
- Federal Cartel Office from Berlin
- Federal Audit Office from Frankfurt am Main
- Bundesaufsichtsamt für das Kreditwesen and Bundesaufsichtsamt für das Versicherungswesen from Berlin
- Bundesinstitut für Berufsbildung
- Bundesgesundheitsamt from Berlin (disbanded)
- Central Agency Postbank (disbanded when the Federal Post Office was privatized)
- Zentrale Auslands- und Fachvermittlung from Frankfurt am Main

These facilities were established in Bonn:

- Central office of the Federal Railway Authority
- Headquarters of the Bundeseisenbahnvermögen (In a broad sense the successor of the headquarters of the Bundesbahn, Frankfurt/Main)

The facilities were partially relocated:

- Bundesforschungsanstalt für Landeskunde und Raumordnung and Bundesbaudirektion (merged in 2002 forming the Bundesamt für Bauwesen und Raumordnung which is exclusively seated in Bonn)
- Statistisches Bundesamt (central office Wiesbaden, subsidiary Berlin)
- Bundesanstalt für Geowissenschaften und Rohstoffe (central office Hannover, subsidiary Berlin)
- Bundesamt für Strahlenschutz (central office Salzgitter, subsidiary Berlin).

== Compensation agreement ==
Also, the Berlin/Bonn act is the foundation of the "Agreement regarding the compensation measures for the Bonn region" German: Vereinbarung über die Ausgleichsmaßnahmen für die Region Bonn of 29 June 1994 providing for €1.437 billion to be used between 1995 and 2004. This money was used to fund various compensation measures and concrete action plans like the foundation of the Bonn-Rhein-Sieg University of Applied Sciences.

== Developments in the 2010s and 2020s ==
According to the government, around 37 percent of federal government positions were based in Bonn by the end of 2015. Some see this as a breach of the Berlin-Bonn Act because it was agreed that the majority of ministerial employees should work in Bonn rather than in Berlin. According to the Federal Ministry of Finance, this division of government offices costs taxpayers at least 8.6 million euros each year, for example in flight fares for officials' business trips. By July 2019, most political parties of Germany, including the Left Party, the Social Democrats (SPD), the Green Party and the Christian Democrats (CDU), were starting to agree to move all governmental institutions remaining in Bonn to Berlin, because ministers and civil servants were flying between the two cities about 230,000 times a year, which was considered too impractical, expensive and environmentally damaging. The distance of 500 kilometres between Bonn and Berlin was only travelable by train in 5.5 hours, so either the train connections had to be considerably upgraded, or Bonn abolished as the secondary capital.

At the same time in 2019, Bonn, together with neighbouring Rhein-Sieg-Kreis and Landkreis Ahrweiler and supported by the governments of North Rhine-Westphalia and Rhineland-Palatinate, presented its proposals for a new Bonn Agreement. This agreement between the Bonn region and the German Federal Government seeks to further strengthen the position of Bonn as Germany's second seat of government, as a seat of the United Nations and as a centre for international cooperation and sustainable development. However, talks between Bonn and the Federal Ministry of the Interior, which is responsible for the compensations measures for the Bonn region, stalled - partly because of the COVID-19 pandemic in 2020.

In January 2025, Construction Minister Klara Geywitz (SPD) stated her support for a declaration by the city of Bonn and the states of North Rhine-Westphalia and Rhineland-Palatinate that sought to make Bonn one of the two seats of the federal government, and thereby secure the socio-economic interests of the region. The mayor of Berlin, Kai Wegner (CDU), responded with a call to once and for all transfer all ministries from Bonn to Berlin for efficiency and sustainability, while retaining all UN offices and international organisations in Bonn. In turn, Bonn's mayor Katja Dörner (Greens) countered that increased digitisation would reduce costs further, and a complete relocation to Berlin would be far more expensive than running the federal government from both centres. Several Green and SPD Bundestag members from Bonn agreed with Geywitz and Dörner, and even the local CDU branch in Bonn criticised Wegner's proposal: "While the requested complete relocation would cost billions, the €10 to €20 million annually provided by the federal government for the simultaneous operation of a second German administrative centre is a sensible investment in Germany's resilience." It added that Berlin neither had the necessary office space nor the housing market or job market situation suited to accommodate one third of all federal officials and their families that would all have to be moved from Bonn to Berlin if Wegner's idea was to be implemented.

== See also ==
- Bonn#20th century and the "Bonn Republic"
- Decision on the Capital of Germany
- History of Berlin
- Proposed relocation of the Parliament of the United Kingdom
