= Palais Schaumburg =

Government office in Bonn

Coordinates: 50°43′15″N 7°07′01″E

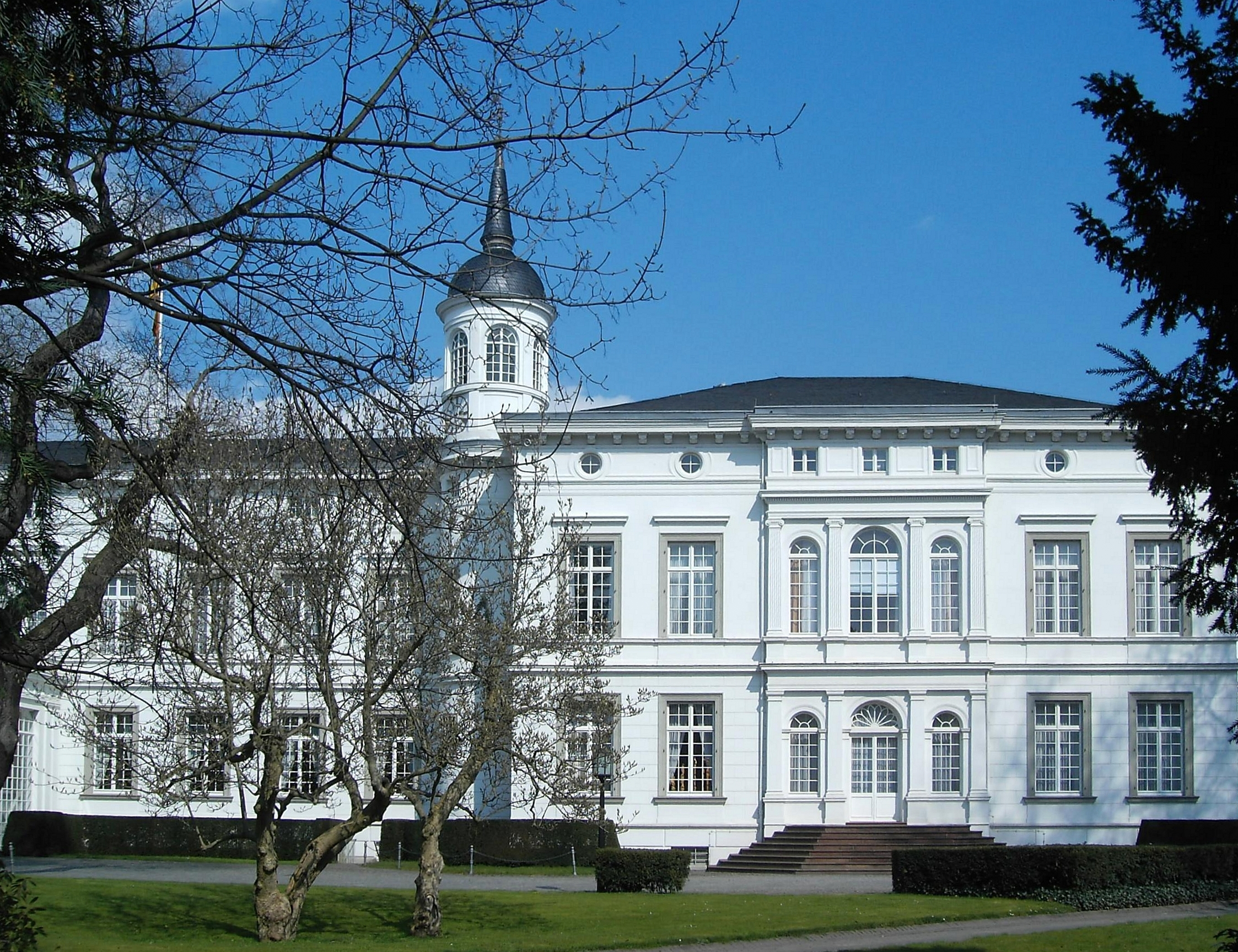
Palais Schaumburg in Bonn

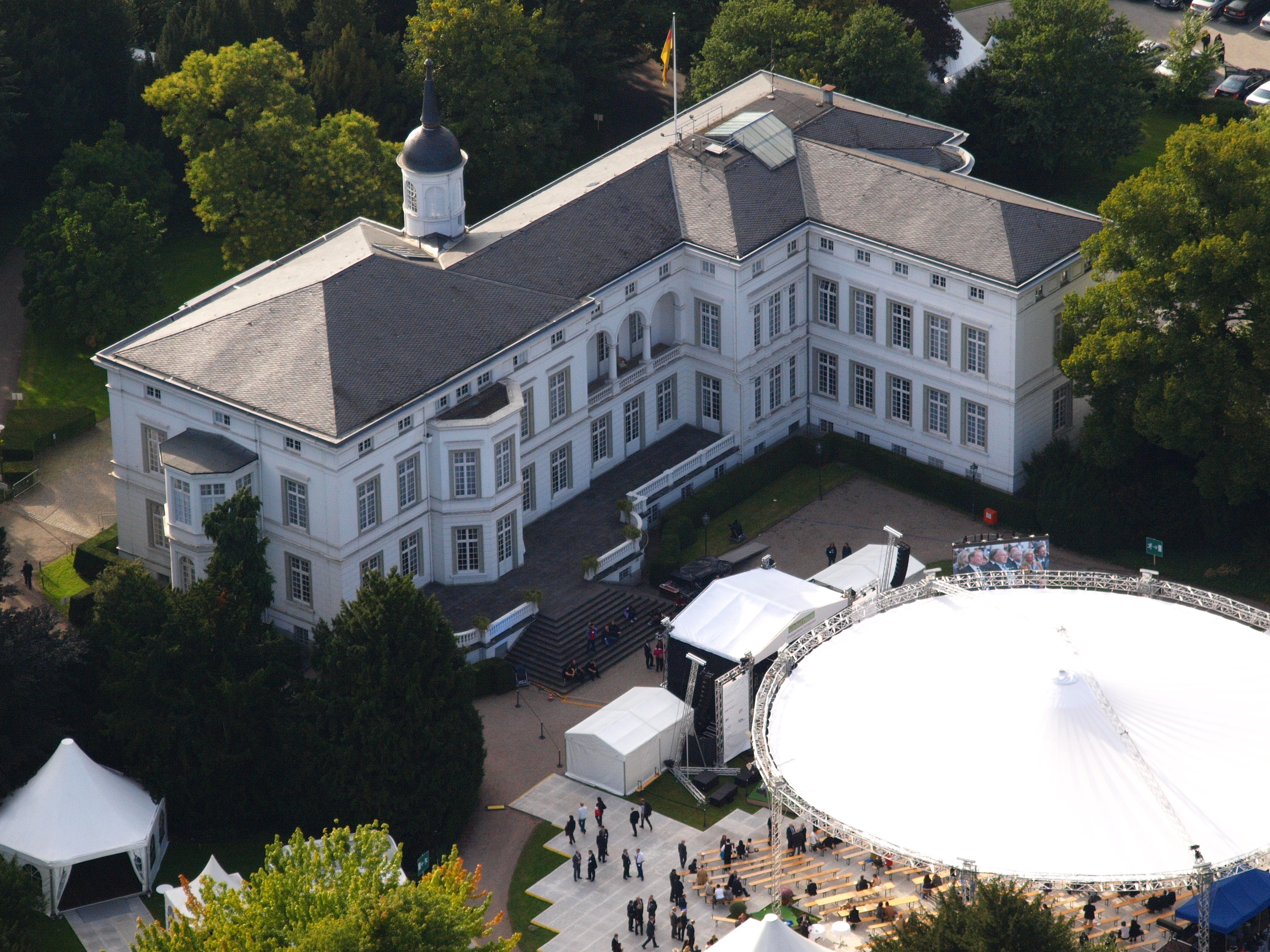
Aerial view of Palais Schaumburg

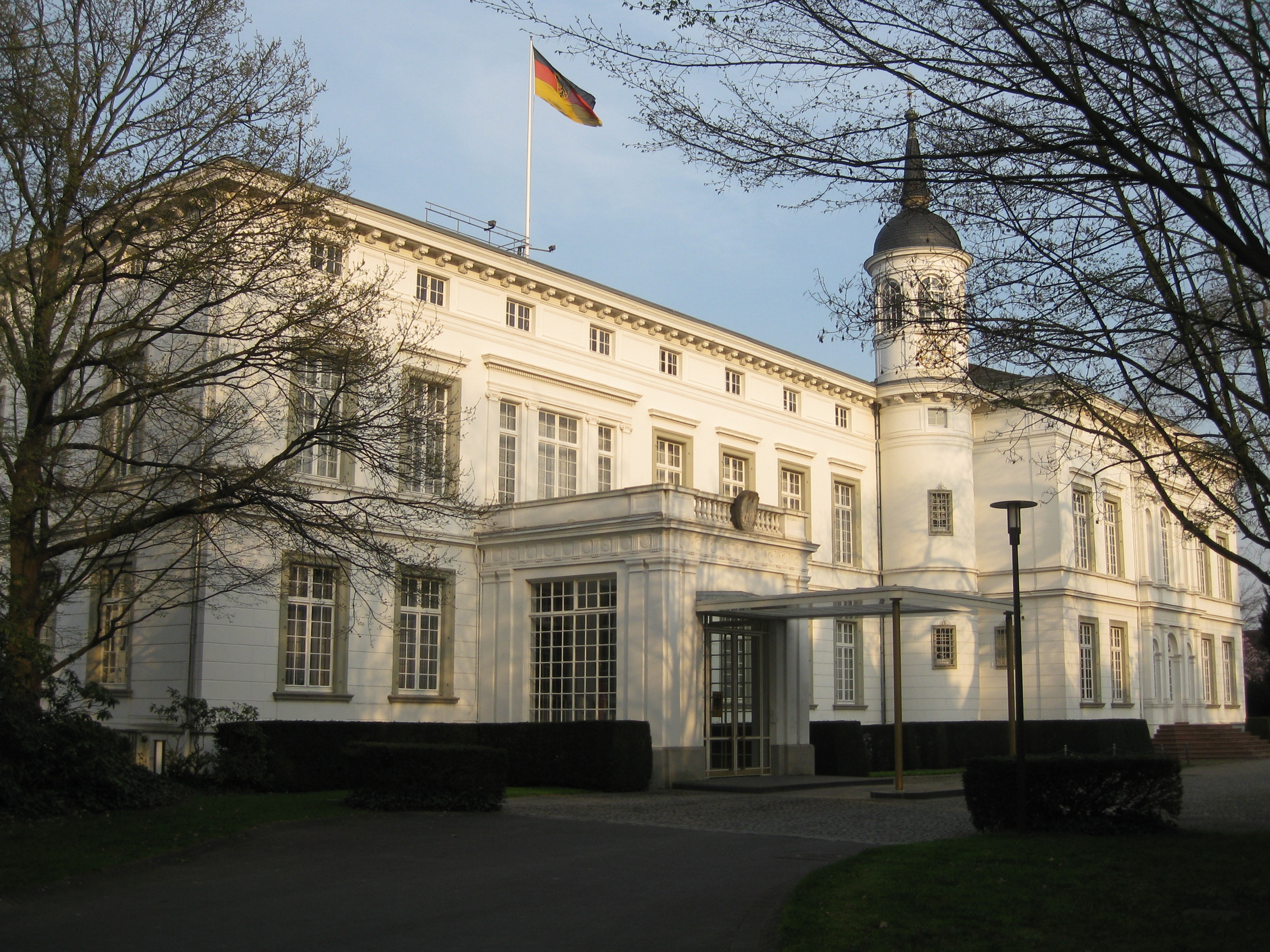
Palais Schaumburg

Palais Schaumburg is a neoclassical-style building in Bonn, Germany, which served as the primary official seat of the German Federal Chancellery and the primary official residence of the Chancellor of the Federal Republic of Germany from 1949 until 1976. As the headquarters of the Federal Chancellery, it was simply known as the House of the Federal Chancellor (German: Haus des Bundeskanzlers). Since 2001, Palais Schaumburg has served as the secondary official seat of the German Federal Chancellery and the secondary official residence of the Chancellor of the Federal Republic of Germany.

== History ==
The late neoclassical palais was constructed between 1858 and 1860 for the cloth manufacturer Wilhelm Loeschigk. Bought by Prince Adolf of Schaumburg-Lippe, it was expanded during the following years. On January 31, 1939, the army bought the palace from Ernst Wolrad, Prince of Schaumburg-Lippe.

After World War II, the Belgian Army staff used the building until it became the official seat of the first chancellor of the Federal Republic, Konrad Adenauer, in November 1949. Two months later, he greeted the new republic’s first state guest, Robert Schuman.

Hans Schwippert rebuilt the building for the use as a Federal Chancellery in 1950. It was also extended by the so-called houses 2 and 3. By 1976, more space was needed, so a new building was planned. Some departments remained in the palais, which remained in use for ceremonial purposes. In 1963, the Wohn- und Empfangsgebäude des Bundeskanzlers, the so-called Chancellor bungalow (Kanzlerbungalow), in the modern style of architect Sep Ruf was built in the spacious park as a semi-official residence for the Chancellors.

Palais Schaumburg became home to the federal ministry for environment, conservation as well as reactor safety (Bundesministeriums für Umwelt, Naturschutz und Reaktorsicherheit) when it was formed in 1986. After the reunification of Germany in 1990, five "Federal Ministers for Special Affairs" kept offices in the palais.

The palais was used at the signing of the treaty about the creation of a currency, economy and social union in 1990 by representatives of both German states.

Palais Schaumburg has served from 2001 as the secondary official seat of the Federal Chancellery and the secondary official residence for the Chancellor, in which different departments are accommodated.

The palais is not publicly accessible. Usually, the Haus der Geschichte provides the opportunity to book tours and to visit the historical place. But since August 2013, the palais has been closed because of building restoration, estimated for five years. Instead of that, the Haus der Geschichte offers an Online-Panorama-Tour. The virtual tour shows all exhibition rooms as well as three views from the outside, providing a look at the building and the park.

== Park ==
A tree has been planted for every former Federal Chancellor of the Federal Republic in the Park Schaumburg, in memory of their periods of office:

Chancellor	Party	In office	Tree	Notes
Konrad Adenauer	CDU	1949–1963	Empress Tree	Replaced in 1992 after storm
Ludwig Erhard	CDU	1963–1966	Giant redwood	
Kurt Georg Kiesinger	CDU	1966–1969	Norway maple	Planted 1978
Willy Brandt	SPD	1969–1974	Ginkgo	Planted 1979
Helmut Schmidt	SPD	1974–1982	Weeping willow	
Helmut Kohl	CDU	1982–1998	European beech	Planted 1987
Gerhard Schröder	SPD	1998–2005	English oak	Planted 2006
