= Parliamentary assistant =

UK member of staff employed by a Member of Parliament

In British politics and some Commonwealth nations, a parliamentary assistant is an unelected partisan staff member employed by a Member of Parliament (MP) to assist them with their parliamentary duties. Parliamentary assistants usually work at the House of Commons in the UK Parliament or in their MP's constituency office.

== Duties ==
The duties of parliamentary assistants vary significantly depending on the MPs they work for and their position in Parliament; but generally they facilitate the day-to-day working life of their MP and make it as efficient as possible. The office in which a parliamentary assistant is based may determine the type of work they do.

== Alternative titles and pay ==
MPs may distinguish between parliamentary assistants in terms of seniority. For example, some MPs differentiate between parliamentary assistants and senior parliamentary assistants. Parliamentary assistants may also be called parliamentary researchers if they are principally tasked with conducting research.

Salaries for MPs' staff are set by the MP they work for, but must be within the bounds of the pay scales set by the Independent Parliamentary Standards Authority.

In Australia, individuals employed by an MP at their electorate (constituency) office are usually referred to as electorate officers, if employed on a permanent or full-time basis, or assistant electorate officers, if employed on a part-time or casual basis. Such persons are also often referred to as staffers, and is a common way for younger party members to gain political experience prior to running for preselection in an internal ballot.

== Controversies ==
In recent years, there has been controversy over the tradition of MPs hiring their family members as parliamentary assistants. In 2017, it was revealed that one in five MPs employed a member of their family, despite the practice being banned for new MPs before the 2017 general election.

== See also ==
- Downing Street Chief of Staff
- Parliamentary secretary
- Permanent secretary
- Private Secretary
