= PCO =

PCO may refer to:

== Business ==
- PCO Imaging, German developer and manufacturer of camera systems
- Pendrell Corporation, the NASDAQ trading symbol for Pendrell Corporation (formerly ICO Global Communications)

== Government ==
- Parliamentary Counsel Office (disambiguation)
- Presidential Communication Office of Indonesia
- Presidential Communications Office of the Philippines
- Privy Council Office (Canada)
- Privy Council Office (United Kingdom)
- Public Carriage Office, the regulatory body for the taxi and private hire trade in London

== Politics ==
- Parti communiste ouvrier, the French translation of the Workers' Communist Party of Canada
- Partido da Causa Operária, the Portuguese name of the Workers' Cause Party
- Workers' Cause Party (Portuguese: Partido da Causa Operária), a political party in Brazil

== Science ==
- Posterior capsular opacification, a complication of cataract surgery
- Polycystic ovaries
- Phosphaethynolate, an anion with the chemical formula [PCO]^{−}

== Professions, qualifications and types of organization ==
- Pleasure Craft Operator Card or PCO Card, a proof of competency to steer a recreational or sporting boat (pleasure craft) in Canada
- Precinct Committee Officer
- Prisoner custody officer
- Private cable operator
- Professional conference organiser
- Prospective Commanding Officer, in the U.S. Navy

== Sport ==
- Pickleball Canada Organization, Canada's governing body for the sport of pickleball
- Pierre Carl Ouellet, Canadian professional wrestler

== Other ==
- Pennsylvania College of Optometry
- Penguin Cafe Orchestra, a musical group
- The Provisional Constitutional Order, an emergency order suspending the Constitution of Pakistan
- Public Call Office, a local call facility with multiple telephone booths
- Punta Colorada Airstrip (ICAO code: PCO), a general aviation airstrip in Punta Colorada, Mexico

== See also ==
- PCOS (disambiguation)
