= Stephan Braunfels =

German architect

- Born: August 1, 1950 (age 76); Überlingen, West Germany
- Education: Technical University of Munich
- Occupation: Architect
- Awards: International Prize Dedalo Minosse (2006)
- Practice: Stephan Braunfels Architekten
- Buildings: Pinakothek der Moderne, Munich, Germany, Paul Löbe Haus, Berlin, Germany, Marie Elisabeth Lüders Haus

Stephan Braunfels (born August 1, 1950) is a German architect.

== Biography ==
Stephan Braunfels was born on August 1, 1950. He completed his studies at the Technical University of Munich in 1975 and established his office in Munich in 1978. He is a grandson of the composer Walter Braunfels.

== Early career ==
Braunfels' first competition success along with his plans and critiques on urban design concepts for Munich formed the basis for the exhibition "Designs for Munich" shown in 1987 at the German Architecture Museum in Frankfurt am Main. As an advisor to the City of Dresden in 1991-1993, Braunfels designed a master plan for the reconstruction of the historic city centre of Dresden. Braunfels opened his Berlin office in 1996.

== Major projects ==
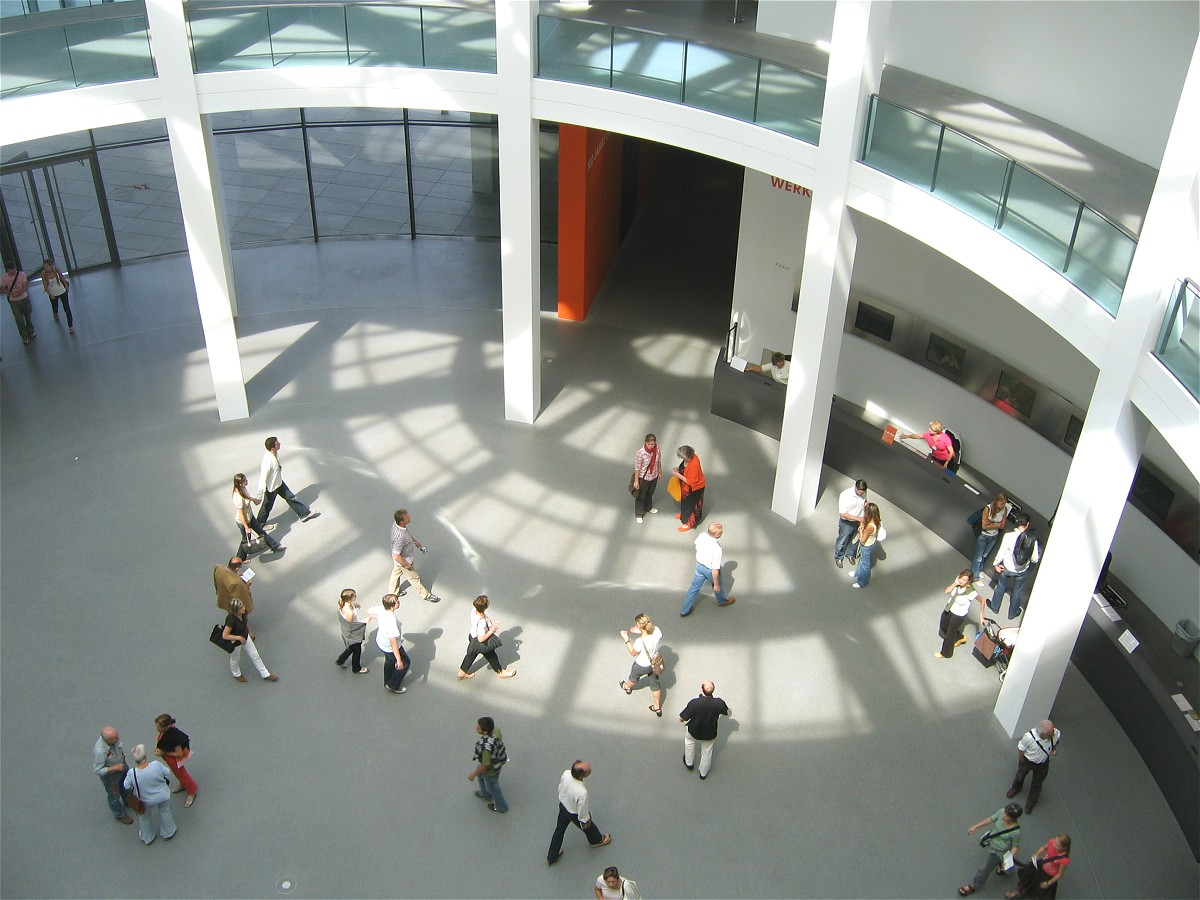
Rotunda of the Pinakothek der Moderne, Munich

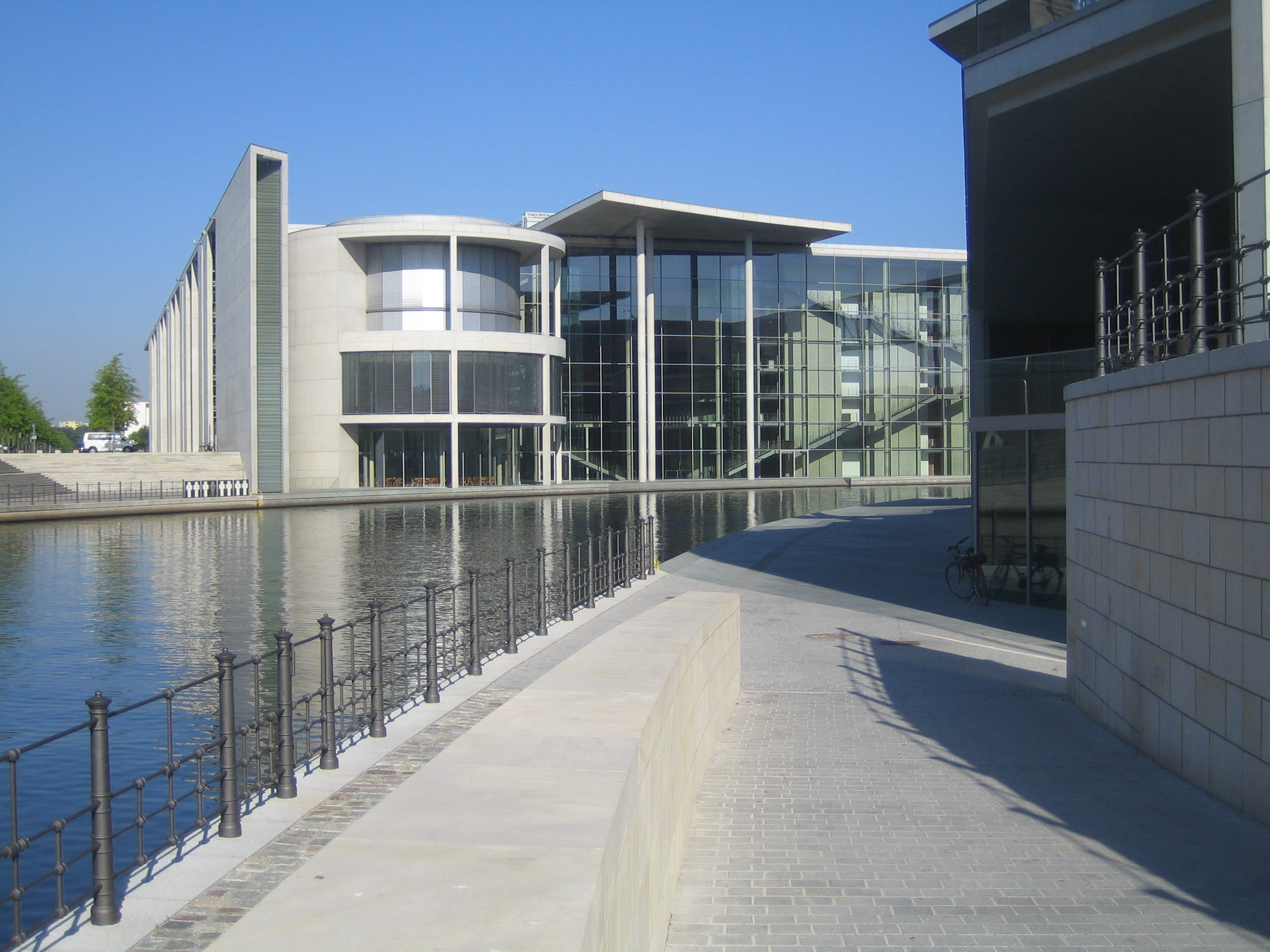
Paul Löbe House, East side on the Spree river bank, Berlin

=== Pinakothek der Moderne ===
After the completion of his first projects in Munich and Dresden, Braunfels won several competitions. The first major competition he won was for Munich's Pinakothek der Moderne in 1992. This project took ten years to come to fruition and opened in late 2002 as one of the largest new museums in Germany. Braunfels garnered some prizes and lauding reviews for this building.

Peter Schjeldahl, reviewing the Pinakothek der Moderne in the New Yorker (January 13, 2003), wrote: "it is a big but self-effacing, "invisible" building: on the outside, a bland concrete-steel-and-glass shoebox; on the inside, a dream of subtly proportioned, shadowless, sugar-white galleries that branch off from an airy, three-story rotunda. In the effulgent atmosphere, you may know where the walls are only by where the pictures hang. I gratefully watched colors combust in Kirchners and Noldes under translucent, all-skylight ceilings. (I'll never again think of Expressionist color as generally sour and arbitrary.) On an ordinary rainy Tuesday in November, the place was thronged with people in festive spirits. The Moderne is a great success.

=== German parliament buildings ===
In 1994, Braunfels' design for the 81,000 square meter German Parliament office building -- Paul Löbe Haus—was awarded first prize. The home of German Parliament's offices and committee chambers opened in 2001 and is one of the most prominent structures in Berlin. In 1996 he was awarded first prize for another parliament building design, the 65,000 square meter Marie Elisabeth Lüders Haus, which houses the German Parliament's offices, library and repository. This second building opened to critical acclaim in 2003.

These three projects are considered to be some of the largest scale projects in post-Cold War Germany and have established Braunfels as an architectural force in Germany.

== Buildings and projects ==
=== Completed ===
- Ulm Department Store, Münstertor, Ulm (2007)
- Ulm Headquarters Sparkasse, Ulm (2007)
- Lohengrin (Opera Production), Baden-Baden, Germany (2006)
- Restaurant Tantris, Munich, Germany (2005)
- Marie Elisabeth Lüders Haus, Berlin, Germany (2003)
- Pinakothek der Moderne, Munich, Germany (2002)
- Paul Löbe Haus, Berlin, Germany (2001)
- Museum Schloss Wilhelmshöhe, Kassel, Germany (2000)
- Atrium Rosegardens, Dresden, Germany (1997)
- Richard Strauss Straße, Munich, Germany (1994)
- Edlinger Platz, Munich, Germany (1994)
- Bürocenter Georg Brauchle Ring, München Office Center Georg Brauchle Ring, Munich, Germany (1993)
- Bürokomplex Halbergmoos, München Office Center Halbergmoos, Munich, Germany (1993)
- Auenstraße, München Auenstraße, Munich, Germany (1993)
- Berliner Straße, München Berliner Straße, Munich, Germany (1993)
- Balanstraße, München Balanstraße, Munich, Germany (1993)
- Georgplatz, Dresden, Germany (1993)
- Masterplan Altstadtring, Dresden, Germany (1992)
- Ares Wall Light, ClassiCon (1992)
- Redesign Marienhof, Munich, Germany (1987)
- Hofgartenareal, Munich, Germany (1984)

=== In progress ===
- Extension German Parliament, Berlin, Germany
- Federal Archives, Berlin, Germany
- Glacis Terraces, Neu Ulm, Germany
- Ulenspiegel (Opera, Stage design), Gera, Germany (2010)

== Awards and honors ==
- 2008 – DA! Architecture made in Berlin Prize for Exhibition of Komische Oper Berlin
- 2007 – DA! Architecture made in Berlin for Exhibition of New Ulm Projects
- 2007 – Bauherrenpreis Baden-Württemberg Award for the New Ulm Projects
- 2006 – German Urban Design Award for the Ulm Urban Design Plan
- 2006 – International Prize Dedalo Minosse for the Marie Elisabeth Lüders Haus, Berlin
- 2004 – BDA Prize Bavaria for the Pinakothek der Moderne
- 2004 – AIT Architecture Prize Colour-Texture-Surface for the Pinakothek der Moderne
- 2003 – Deutscher Architekturpreis Award for the Pinakothek der Moderne
- 2003 – Gold Medal "München Leuchtet"
- 2003 – Nominated for the Mies van der Rohe Award for Pinakothek der Moderne and Paul-Löbe-Haus
- 2002 – AZ Star of the Year for the Pinakothek der Moderne
- 1994 – Deutscher Kritikerpreis
- 1992 – AZ Star of the Year for Architecture
