= Idea =

Mental image or concept

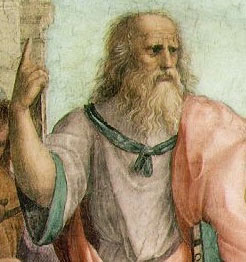
Plato, one of the first philosophers to discuss ideas in detail. Aristotle claims that many of Plato's views were Pythagorean in origin.

An idea (from the Greek word: ἰδέα (idea), meaning 'a form, or a pattern') is the result of thought. Although the word is used in common usage, in philosophy, ideas can also be mental representational images of some object. Many philosophers have considered ideas to be a fundamental ontological category of being. The capacity to create and understand the meaning of ideas is considered to be an essential and defining feature of human beings.

An idea arises in a reflexive, spontaneous manner, even without thinking or serious reflection, for example, when we talk about the idea of a person or a place. A new or an original idea can often lead to innovation. Our actions are based upon beliefs, beliefs are patterns or organized sets of ideas.

== Etymology ==
The word idea comes from Greek ἰδέα, romanized: idea, 'form, pattern', from the root of ἰδεῖν idein, 'to see'.

== History ==
An argument over the underlying nature of ideas was opened by Plato, whose exposition of his theory of forms—which recurs and accumulates over the course of his many dialogs—appropriates and adds a new sense to the Greek word for things that are "seen" (re. εἶδος) that highlights those elements of perception which are encountered without material or objective reference available to the eyes (re. ἰδέα). As this argument was disseminated the word "idea" began to take on connotations that would be more familiarly associated with the term today. In the fifth book of his Republic, Plato defines philosophy as the love of this formal (as opposed to visual) way of seeing.

Plato advanced the theory that perceived but immaterial objects of awareness constitute a realm of deathless forms or ideas from which the material world emanates. Aristotle challenged Plato in this area, positing that the phenomenal world of ideas arises as mental composites of remembered observations. Though it is anachronistic to apply these terms to thinkers from antiquity, it clarifies the argument between Plato and Aristotle if we call Plato an idealist thinker and Aristotle an empiricist thinker.

This antagonism between empiricism and idealism generally characterizes the dynamism of the argument over the theory of ideas up to the present. This schism in theory has never been resolved to the satisfaction of thinkers from both sides of the disagreement and is represented today in the split between analytic and continental schools of philosophy. Persistent contradictions between classical physics and quantum mechanics may be pointed to as a rough analogy for the gap between the two schools of thought.

== Philosophy ==
=== Plato ===
Plato in Ancient Greece was one of the earliest philosophers to provide a detailed discussion of ideas and of the thinking process (in Plato's Greek the word idea carries a rather different sense of our modern English term). Plato argued in dialogues such as the Phaedo, Symposium, Republic, and Timaeus that there is a realm of ideas or forms (eidei), which exist independently of anyone who may have thoughts on these ideas, and it is the ideas which distinguish mere opinion from knowledge, for unlike material things which are transient and liable to contrary properties, ideas are unchanging and nothing but just what they are. Consequently, Plato seems to assert forcefully that material things can only be the objects of opinion; real knowledge can only be had of unchanging ideas. Furthermore, ideas for Plato appear to serve as universals; consider the following passage from the Republic:

"We both assert that there are," I said, "and distinguish in speech, many fair things, many good things, and so on for each kind of thing."

"Yes, so we do."

"And we also assert that there is a fair itself, a good itself, and so on for all things that we set down as many. Now, again, we refer to them as one idea of each as though the idea were one; and we address it as that which really is."

"That's so."

"And, moreover, we say that the former are seen, but not intellected, while the ideas are intellected but not seen."

— Plato, Bk. VI 507b-c

=== René Descartes ===
Descartes often wrote of the meaning of the idea as an image or representation, often but not necessarily "in the mind", which was well known in the vernacular. Despite Descartes' invention of the non-Platonic use of the term, he at first followed this vernacular use.^{b} In his Meditations on First Philosophy he says, "Some of my thoughts are like images of things, and it is to these alone that the name 'idea' properly belongs." He sometimes maintained that ideas were innate and uses of the term idea diverge from the original primary scholastic use. He provides multiple non-equivalent definitions of the term, uses it to refer to as many as six distinct kinds of entities, and divides ideas inconsistently into various genetic categories. For him knowledge took the form of ideas and philosophical investigation is devoted to the consideration of these entities.

=== John Locke ===
John Locke's use of idea stands in striking contrast to Plato's. In his Introduction to An Essay Concerning Human Understanding, Locke defines idea as "that term which, I think, serves best to stand for whatsoever is the object of the understanding when a man thinks, I have used it to express whatever is meant by phantasm, notion, species, or whatever it is which the mind can be employed about in thinking; And I could not avoid frequently using it." He said he regarded the contribution offered in his essay as necessary to examine our own abilities and discern what objects our understandings were, or were not, fitted to deal with. In this style of ideal conception other outstanding figures followed in his footsteps — Hume and Kant in the 18th century, Arthur Schopenhauer in the 19th century, and Bertrand Russell, Ludwig Wittgenstein, and Karl Popper in the 20th century. Locke always believed in the good sense — not pushing things to extremes and while taking fully into account the plain facts of the matter. He prioritized common-sense ideas that struck him as "good-tempered, moderate, and down-to-earth."

As John Locke studied humans in his work "An Essay Concerning Human Understanding" he continually referenced Descartes for ideas as he asked this fundamental question: "When we are concerned with something about which we have no certain knowledge, what rules or standards should guide how confident we allow ourselves to be that our opinions are right?" Put in another way, he inquired into how humans might verify their ideas, and considered the distinctions between different types of ideas. Locke found that an idea "can simply mean some sort of brute experience." He shows that there are "No innate principles in the mind." Thus, he concludes that "our ideas are all experienced in nature." An experience can either be a sensation or a reflection: "consider whether there are any innate ideas in the mind before any are brought in by the impression from sensation or reflection." Therefore, an idea was an experience in which the human mind apprehended something.

In a Lockean view, there are really two types of ideas: complex and simple. Simple ideas are the building blocks for more complex ideas, and "While the mind is wholly passive in the reception of simple ideas, it is very active in the building of complex ideas…" Complex ideas, therefore, can either be modes, substances, or relations.

Modes combine simpler ideas in order to convey new information. For instance, David Banach gives the example of beauty as a mode. He points to combinations of color and form as qualities constitutive of this mode. Substances, however, are distinct from modes. Substances convey the underlying formal unity of certain objects, such as dogs, cats, or tables. Relations represent the relationship between two or more ideas that contain analogous elements to one another without the implication of underlying formal unity. A painting or a piece of music, for example, can both be called 'art' without belonging to the same substance. They are related as forms of art (the term 'art' in this illustration would be a 'mode of relations'). In this way, Locke concluded that the formal ambiguity around ideas he initially sought to clarify had been resolved.

=== David Hume ===
Hume differs from Locke by limiting idea to only one of two possible types of perception. The other one is called "impression", and is more lively: these are perceptions we have "when we hear, or see, or feel, or love, or hate, or desire, or will." Ideas are more complex and are built upon these more basic and more grounded perceptions. Hume shared with Locke the basic empiricist premise that it is only from life experiences (whether their own or others') that humans' knowledge of the existence of anything outside of themselves can be ultimately derived, that they shall carry on doing what they are prompted to do by their emotional drives of varying kinds. In choosing the means to those ends, they shall follow their accustomed associations of ideas.^{d} Hume has contended and defended the notion that "reason alone is merely the 'slave of the passions'."

=== Immanuel Kant ===
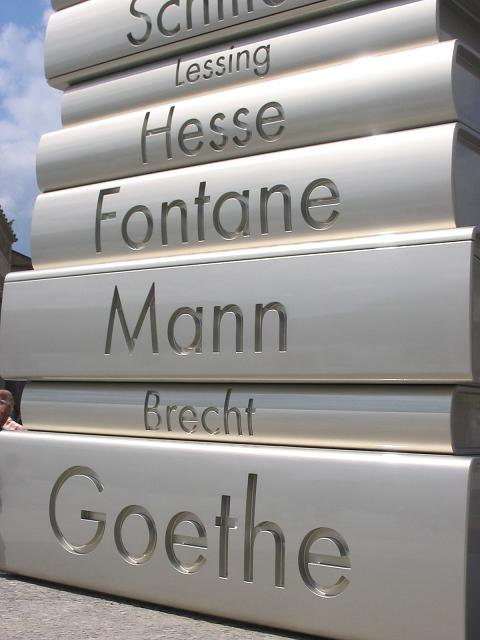
"Modern Book Printing" from the Walk of Ideas

Immanuel Kant defines ideas by distinguishing them from concepts. Concepts arise by the compositing of experience into abstract categorial representations of presumed or encountered empirical objects whereas the origin of ideas, for Kant, is a priori to experience. Regulative ideas, for example, are ideals that one must tend towards, but by definition may not be completely realized as objects of empirical experience. Liberty, according to Kant, is an idea whereas "tree" (as an abstraction covering all species of trees) is a concept. The autonomy of the rational and universal subject is opposed to the determinism of the empirical subject. Kant felt that it is precisely in knowing its limits that philosophy exists. The business of philosophy he thought was not to give rules, but to analyze the private judgement of good common sense.^{e}

=== Rudolf Steiner ===
Whereas Kant declares limits to knowledge ("we can never know the thing in itself"), in his epistemological work, Rudolf Steiner sees ideas as "objects of experience" which the mind apprehends, much as the eye apprehends light. In Goethean Science (1883), he declares, "Thinking ... is no more and no less an organ of perception than the eye or ear. Just as the eye of perception perceives colors and the ear sounds, so thinking perceives ideas." He holds this to be the premise upon which Goethe made his natural-scientific observations.

=== Wilhelm Wundt ===
Wundt widens the term from Kant's usage to include conscious representation of some object or process of the external world. In so doing, he includes not only ideas of memory and imagination, but also perceptual processes, whereas other psychologists confine the term to the first two groups. One of Wundt's main concerns was to investigate conscious processes in their own context by experiment and introspection. He regarded both of these as exact methods, interrelated in that experimentation created optimal conditions for introspection. Where the experimental method failed, he turned to other objectively valuable aids, specifically to those products of cultural communal life which lead one to infer particular mental motives. Outstanding among these are speech, myth, and social custom. Wundt designed the basic mental activity apperception — a unifying function which should be understood as an activity of the will. Many aspects of his empirical physiological psychology are used today. One is his principles of mutually enhanced contrasts and of assimilation and dissimilation (i.e. in color and form perception and his advocacy of objective methods of expression and of recording results, especially in language. Another is the principle of heterogony of ends — that multiply motivated acts lead to unintended side effects which in turn become motives for new actions.

=== Charles Sanders Peirce ===
C. S. Peirce published the first full statement of pragmatism in his important works "How to Make Our Ideas Clear" (1878) and "The Fixation of Belief" (1877). In "How to Make Our Ideas Clear" he proposed that a clear idea (in his study he uses concept and idea as synonymic) is defined as one, when it is apprehended such as it will be recognized wherever it is met, and no other will be mistaken for it. If it fails of this clearness, it is said to be obscure. He argued that to understand an idea clearly we should ask ourselves what difference its application would make to our evaluation of a proposed solution to the problem at hand. Pragmatism (a term he appropriated for use in this context), he defended, was a method for ascertaining the meaning of terms (as a theory of meaning). The originality of his ideas is in their rejection of what was accepted as a view and understanding of knowledge as impersonal facts which had been accepted by scientists for some 250 years. Peirce contended that we acquire knowledge as participants, not as spectators. He felt "the real", sooner or later, is composed of information that has been acquired through ideas and knowledge and ordered by the application of logical reasoning. The rational distinction of the empirical object is not prior to its perception by a knowledgeable subject, in other words. He also published many papers on logic in relation to ideas.

=== G. F. Stout and J. M. Baldwin ===
G. F. Stout and J. M. Baldwin, in the Dictionary of Philosophy and Psychology, define the idea as "the reproduction with a more or less adequate image, of an object not actually present to the senses." They point out that an idea and a perception are by various authorities contrasted in various ways. "Difference in degree of intensity", "comparative absence of bodily movement on the part of the subject", "comparative dependence on mental activity", are suggested by psychologists as characteristic of an idea as compared with a perception.

An idea, in the narrower and generally accepted sense of a mental reproduction, is frequently composite. That is, as in the example given above of the idea of a chair, a great many objects, differing materially in detail, all call a single idea. When a man, for example, has obtained an idea of chairs in general by comparison with which he can say "This is a chair, that is a stool", he has what is known as an "abstract idea" distinct from the reproduction in his mind of any particular chair (see abstraction). Furthermore, a complex idea may not have any corresponding physical object, though its particular constituent elements may severally be the reproductions of actual perceptions. Thus the idea of a centaur is a complex mental picture composed of the ideas of man and horse, that of a mermaid of a woman and a fish.

=== Walter Benjamin ===
"Ideas are to objects [of perception] as constellations are to stars," writes Walter Benjamin in the introduction to his The Origin of German Tragic Drama. "The set of concepts which assist in the representation of an idea lend it actuality as such a configuration. For phenomena are not incorporated into ideas. They are not contained in them. Ideas are, rather, their objective virtual arrangement, their objective interpretation."

Benjamin advances, "That an idea is that moment in the substance and being of a word in which this word has become, and performs, as a symbol." as George Steiner summarizes. In this way techne--art and technology—may be represented, ideally, as "discrete, fully autonomous objects...[thus entering] into fusion without losing their identity."

== In anthropology and the social sciences ==
Diffusion studies explore the spread of ideas from culture to culture. Some anthropological theories hold that all cultures imitate ideas from one or a few original cultures, the Adam of the Bible, or several cultural circles that overlap. Evolutionary diffusion theory holds that cultures are influenced by one another but that similar ideas can be developed in isolation.

In the mid-20th century, social scientists began to study how and why ideas spread from one person or culture to another. Everett Rogers pioneered diffusion of innovations studies, using research to prove factors in adoption and profiles of adopters of ideas. In 1976, in his book The Selfish Gene, Richard Dawkins suggested applying biological evolutionary theories to the spread of ideas. He coined the term meme to describe an abstract unit of selection, equivalent to the gene in evolutionary biology.

== Ideas and intellectual property ==
=== Relationship between ideas and patents ===
1474: In Italy, senate of Venice passed the first statute protecting intellectual property.

"Any person in this city who makes any new and ingenious contrivance, not made heretofore in our dominion, shall, as soon as it is perfected so that it can be used and exercised, give notice of the same to our State Judicial Office, it being forbidden up to 10 years for any other person in any territory of ours to make a contrivance in the form and resemblance thereof."

Recognized rights of inventors and provided compensation for infringements.

Set a precedent for IP rights in Europe.

Patent law regulates various aspects related to the functional manifestation of inventions based on new ideas or incremental improvements to existing ones. Thus, patents have a direct relationship to ideas.

=== Relationship between ideas and copyrights ===
A picture of a lightbulb is often used to represent a person having a bright idea.

In some cases, authors can be granted limited legal monopolies on the manner in which certain works are expressed. This is known colloquially as copyright, although the term intellectual property is used mistakenly in place of copyright. Copyright law regulating the aforementioned monopolies generally does not cover the actual ideas. The law does not bestow the legal status of property upon ideas per se. Instead, laws purport to regulate events related to the usage, copying, production, sale and other forms of exploitation of the fundamental expression of a work, that may or may not carry ideas. Copyright law is fundamentally different from patent law in this respect: patents do grant monopolies on ideas (more on this below).

A copyright is meant to regulate some aspects of the usage of expressions of a work, not an idea. Thus, copyrights have a negative relationship to ideas.

Work means a tangible medium of expression. It may be an original or derivative work of art, be it literary, dramatic, musical recitation, artistic, related to sound recording, etc. In (at least) countries adhering to the Berne Convention, copyright automatically starts covering the work upon the original creation and fixation thereof, without any extra steps. While creation usually involves an idea, the idea in itself does not suffice for the purposes of claiming copyright.

=== Relationship of ideas to confidentiality agreements ===
Confidentiality and nondisclosure agreements are legal instruments that assist corporations and individuals in keeping ideas from escaping to the general public. Generally, these instruments are covered by contract law.

== See also ==
- Idealism
- Brainstorming
- Creativity techniques
- Chief idea officer
- Diffusion of innovations
- Form
- Ideology
- List of perception-related topics
- Notion (philosophy)
- Object of the mind
- Think tank
- Thought experiment
- History of ideas
- Intellectual history
- Concept
- Philosophical analysis
