= Paul Löbe House =

- Paul-Löbe-Haus
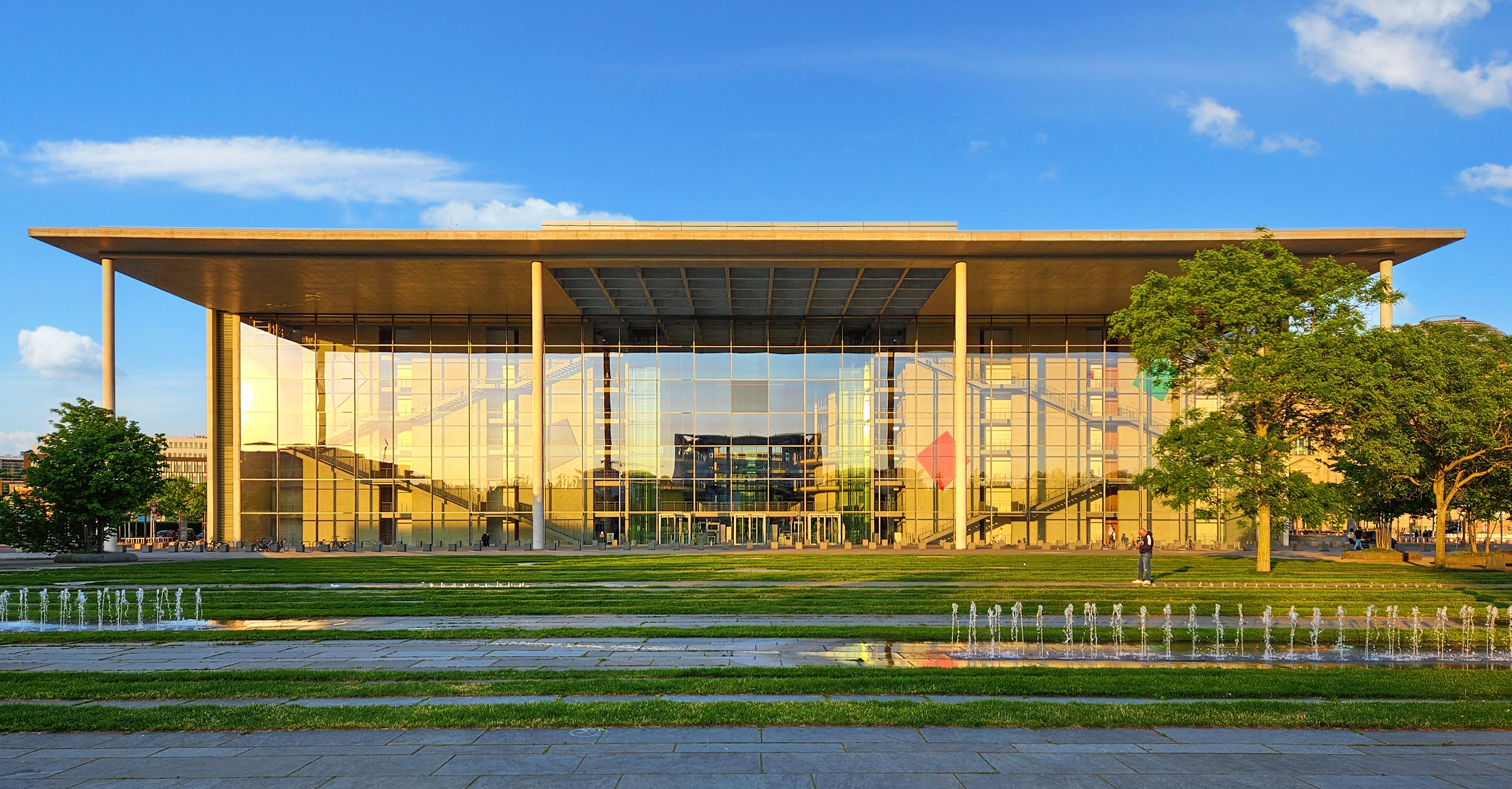
- The Paul Löbe House, west side
- Interactive map of the Paul Löbe House area

General information
- Architectural style: Postmodernism
- Location: Tiergarten, Berlin, Germany
- Coordinates: 52°31′13″N 13°22′29″E
- Year built: 1997–2002

Design and construction
- Architect: Stephan Braunfels
- Known for: German Bundestag

The Paul Löbe House (PLH; German: Paul-Löbe-Haus) is an office building of the German Bundestag in Berlin's government district. It is located on the site of the former Alsenviertel district on the southern edge of Spreebogenpark. It is named after Paul Löbe, a Social Democratic Party (SPD) politician, who was President of the Reichstag and oldest member of the first German Bundestag. The main entrance is on Konrad-Adenauer-Straße, which runs to the west. Another entrance is on Paul-Löbe-Allee.

== History ==
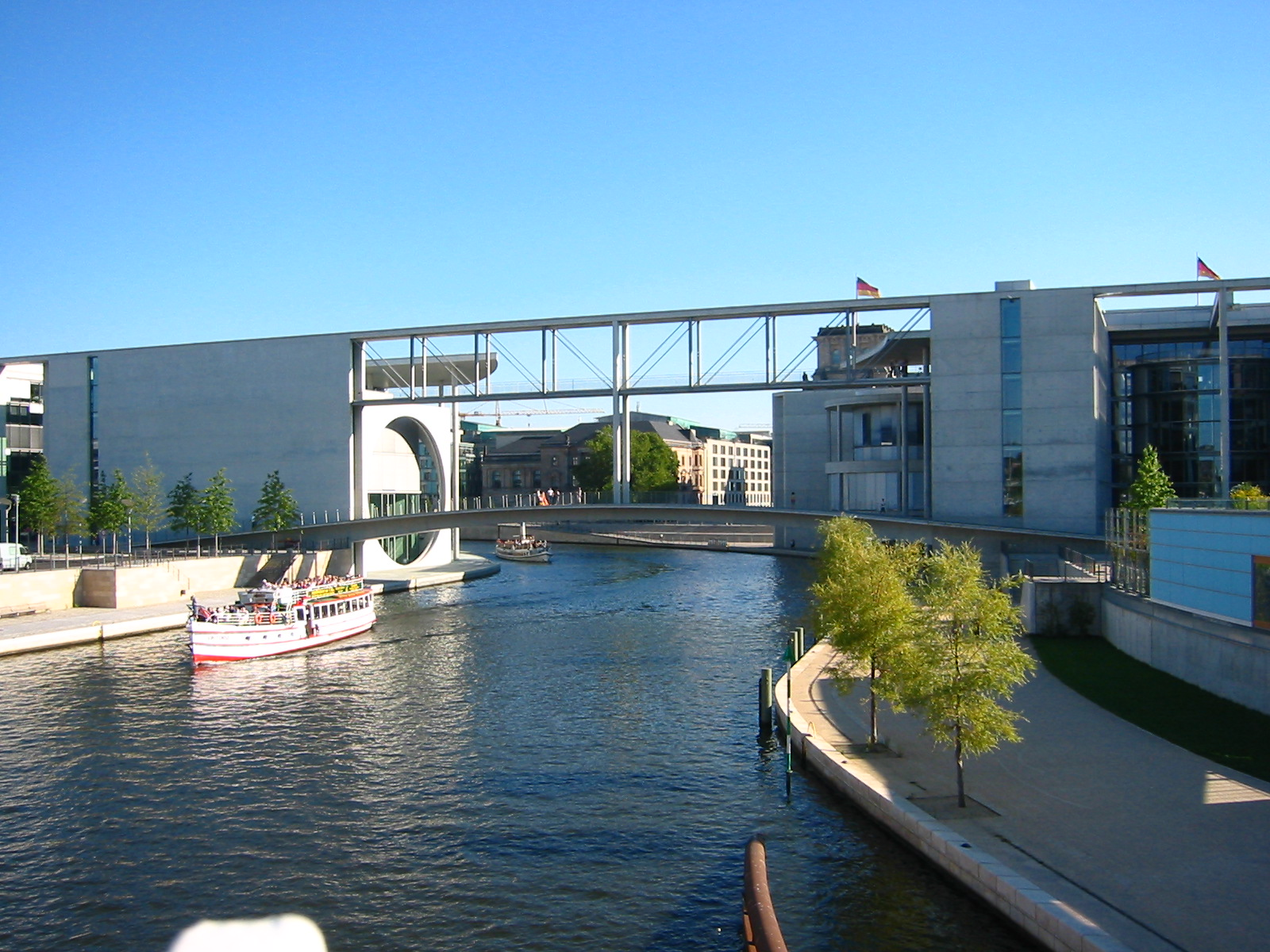
The two Spree bridges, one above the other, on the right the Paul Löbe House

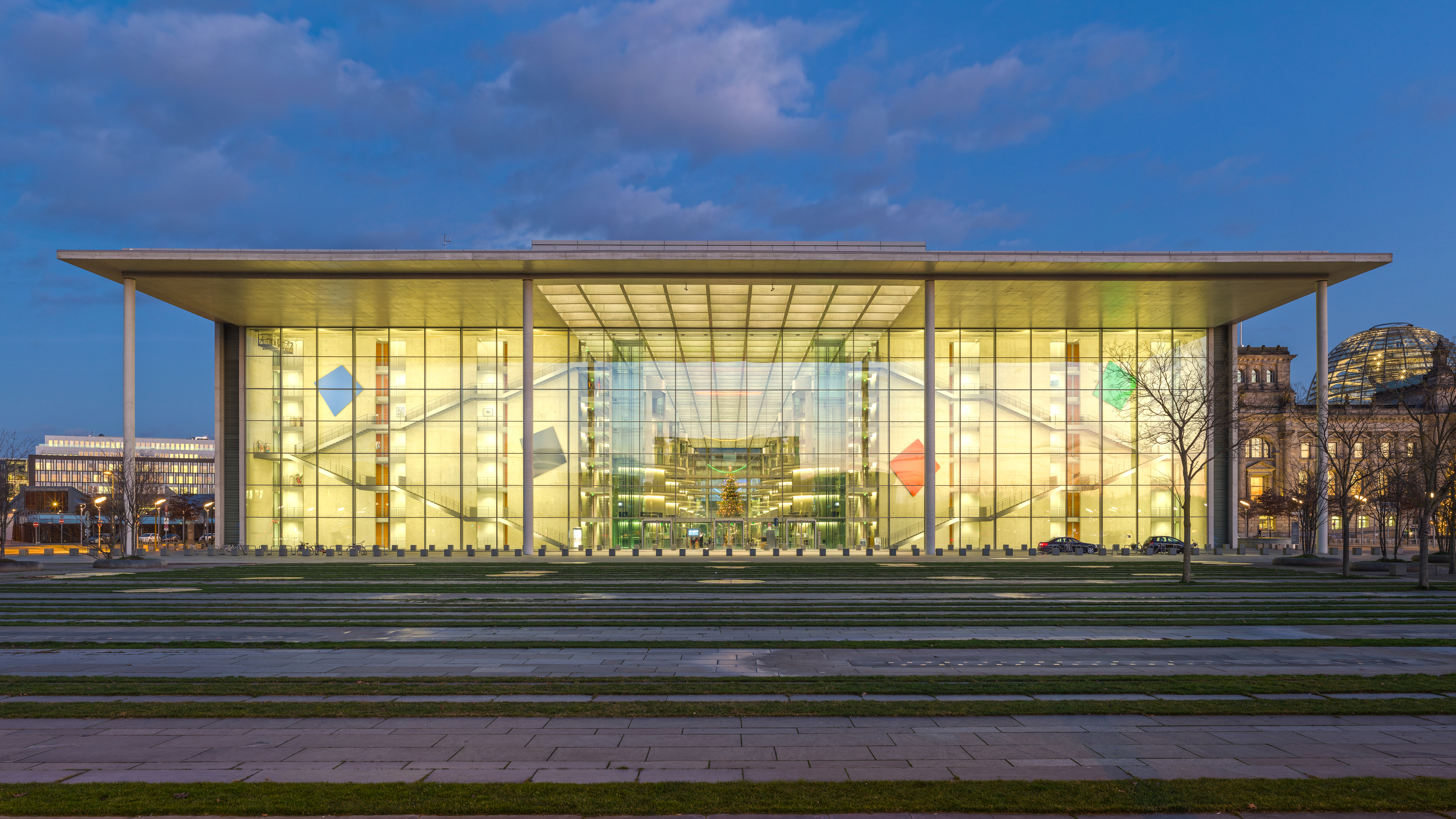
West side at night; the Federal Chancellery opposite is reflected in the glass façade

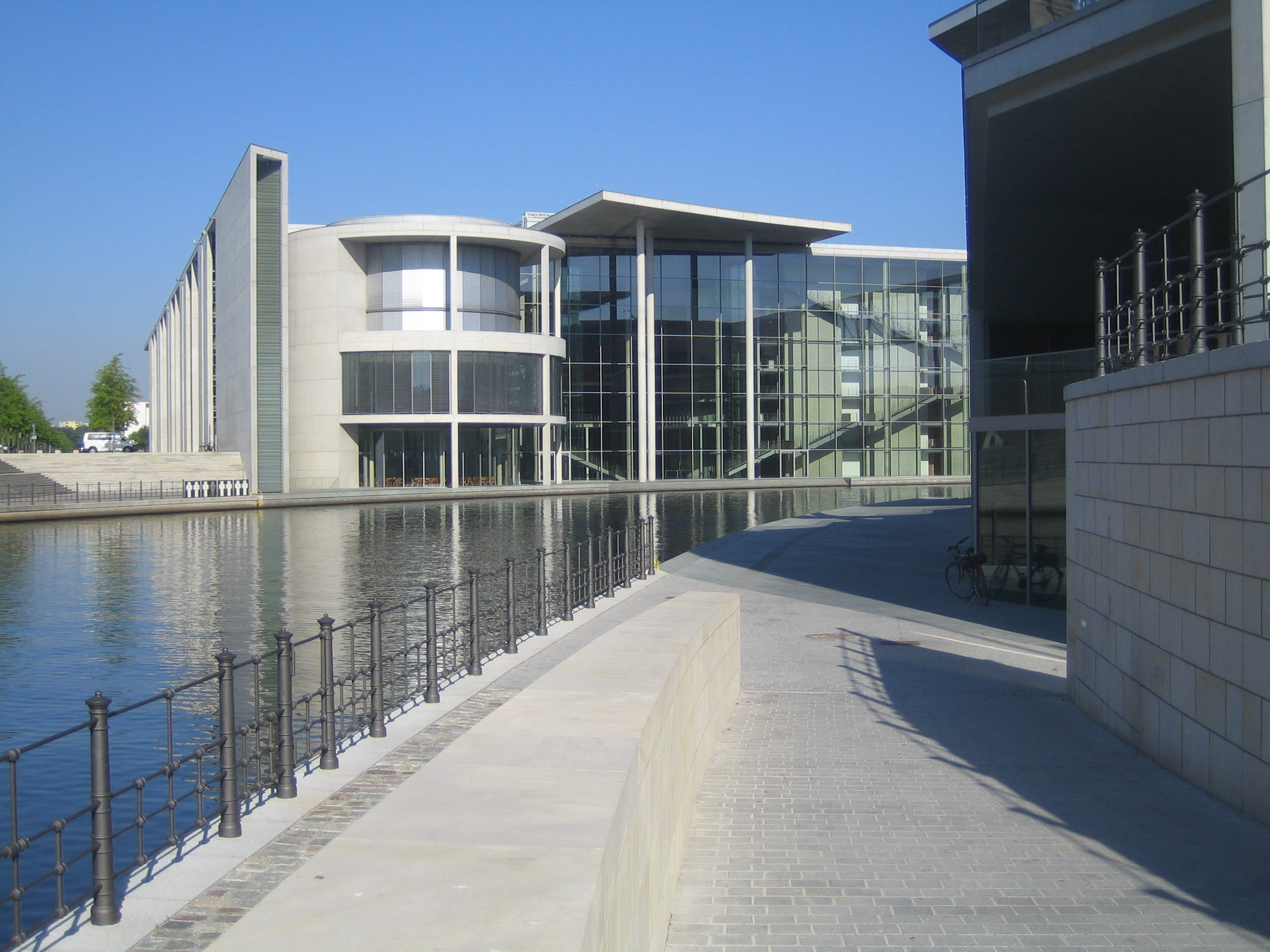
East side, Spree river bank, to the left of the building on the bank is the memorial site for the victims of the Wall, the White Crosses

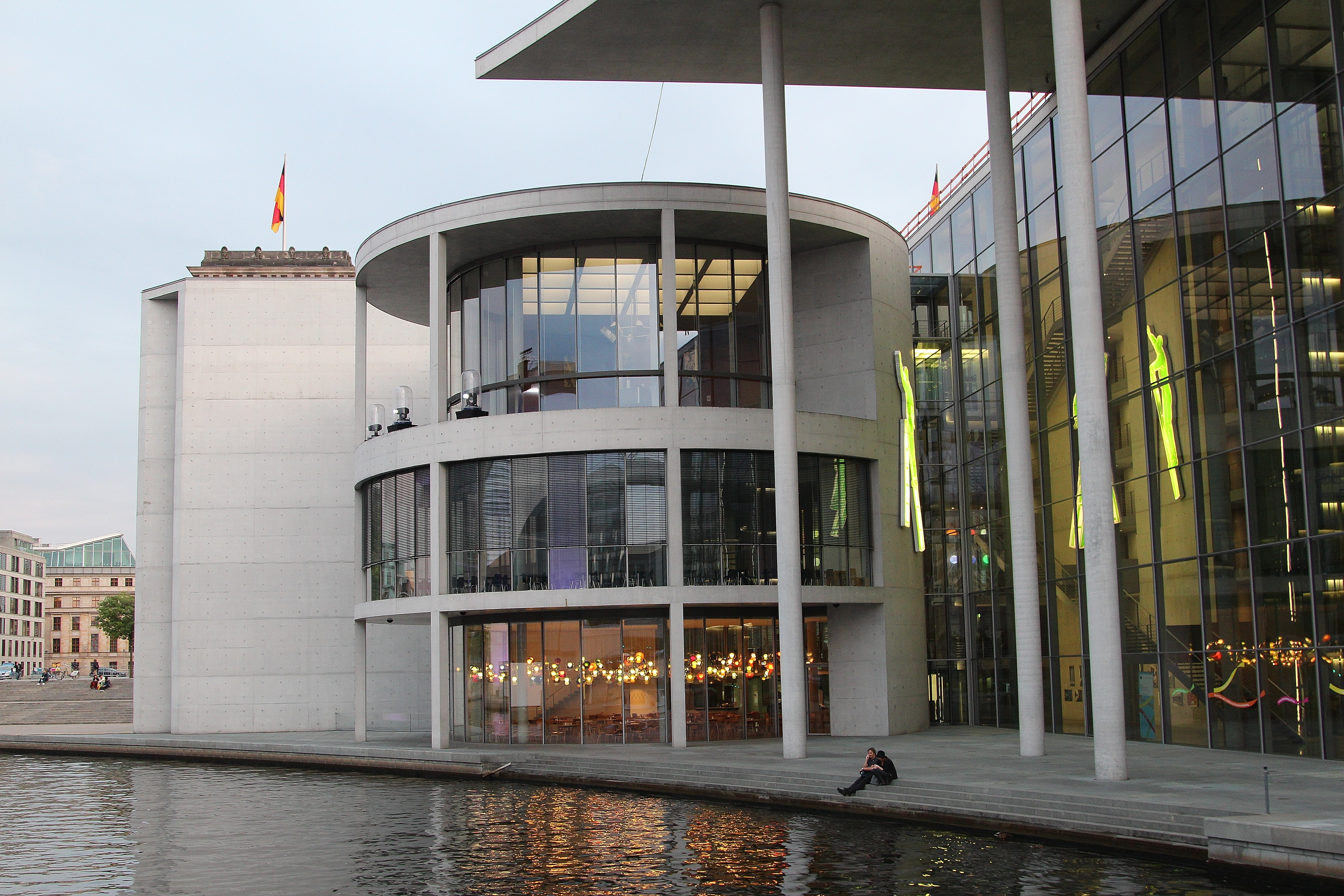
East side, seen from the Spree

In 1992, an urban design competition was announced for the Spreebogen area in Berlin. Architects Axel Schultes and Charlotte Frank won first prize for their master plan for the "Band des Bundes" (Band of the Federation), which includes the Federal Chancellery, the Paul Löbe House, the Marie-Elisabeth Lüders House , and the unrealized Bürgerforum. A competition for the implementation of the project was subsequently launched in the fall of 1994, and Munich architect Stephan Braunfels won with his design for the Paul Löbe and Marie-Elisabeth Lüders Houses.

The Paul Löbe House and the Marie-Elisabeth Lüders House form a unit through their architecture, for example, through the contours of the roof edges that match the Spree and the two bridges that connect the buildings on either side of the Spree. The architect of both buildings refers to the bridges as a "leap over the Spree." The lower bridge is open to the public, the upper one reserved for members of parliament—and is therefore called the "higher civil service career path".

The connection of the buildings from east to west symbolises the unity of East and West Germany (the Berlin Wall ran across the built-up area) and overrides the Nazi era vision of a "world capital Germania" – here characterised by a North-South axis.

The foundation stone for the new Bundestag building was laid on 28 April 1997, by then-President of the Bundestag, Rita Süssmuth, on the eastern bend of the Spree. The Paul Löbe House was opened in 2001.

On 24 July 2019, the 109th session of the 19th Bundestag took place at the Paul Löbe House, during which Annegret Kramp-Karrenbauer was sworn in as Federal Minister of Defence. The session was held here as an exception, as it took place during the parliamentary summer break, during which renovation work was being carried out in the plenary hall of the Reichstag building.

The 17th Federal Assembly and the election of the German Federal President on 13 February 2022 were also held in the Paul Löbe House instead of the Reichstag building due to the COVID-19 pandemic and the need to maintain social distancing.

== Building ==
The building contains 1,700 rooms and 61,000 m² of usable space. It primarily serves to accommodate functional areas that require proximity to the Reichstag building for the smooth running of Parliament. These include 550 offices for 275 members of parliament, 21 meeting rooms for committees, and approximately 450 offices for committee secretariats, as well as a restaurant for members of parliament, staff, and visitors. Furthermore, the central visitor services will be located here.

Since May 2001, there have been two direct crossings from the Paul Löbe House to the Marie-Elisabeth Lüders House via the Marie-Elisabeth Lüders Bridge. In addition, the Government District Service Tunnel connects the Paul Löbe House with the Marie-Elisabeth Lüders House, the Jakob Kaiser House, and the Reichstag Building.

Interiors

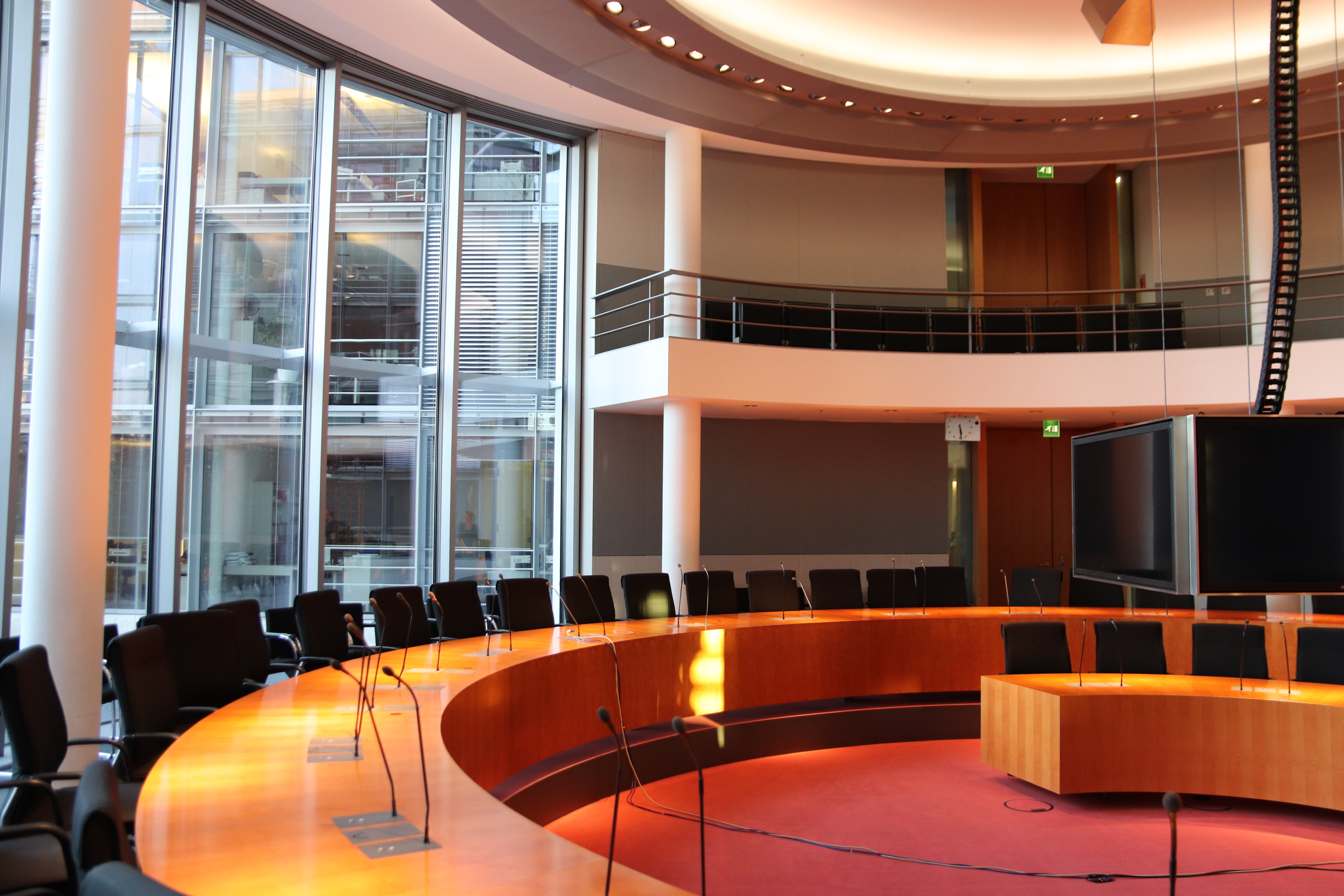
Committee room

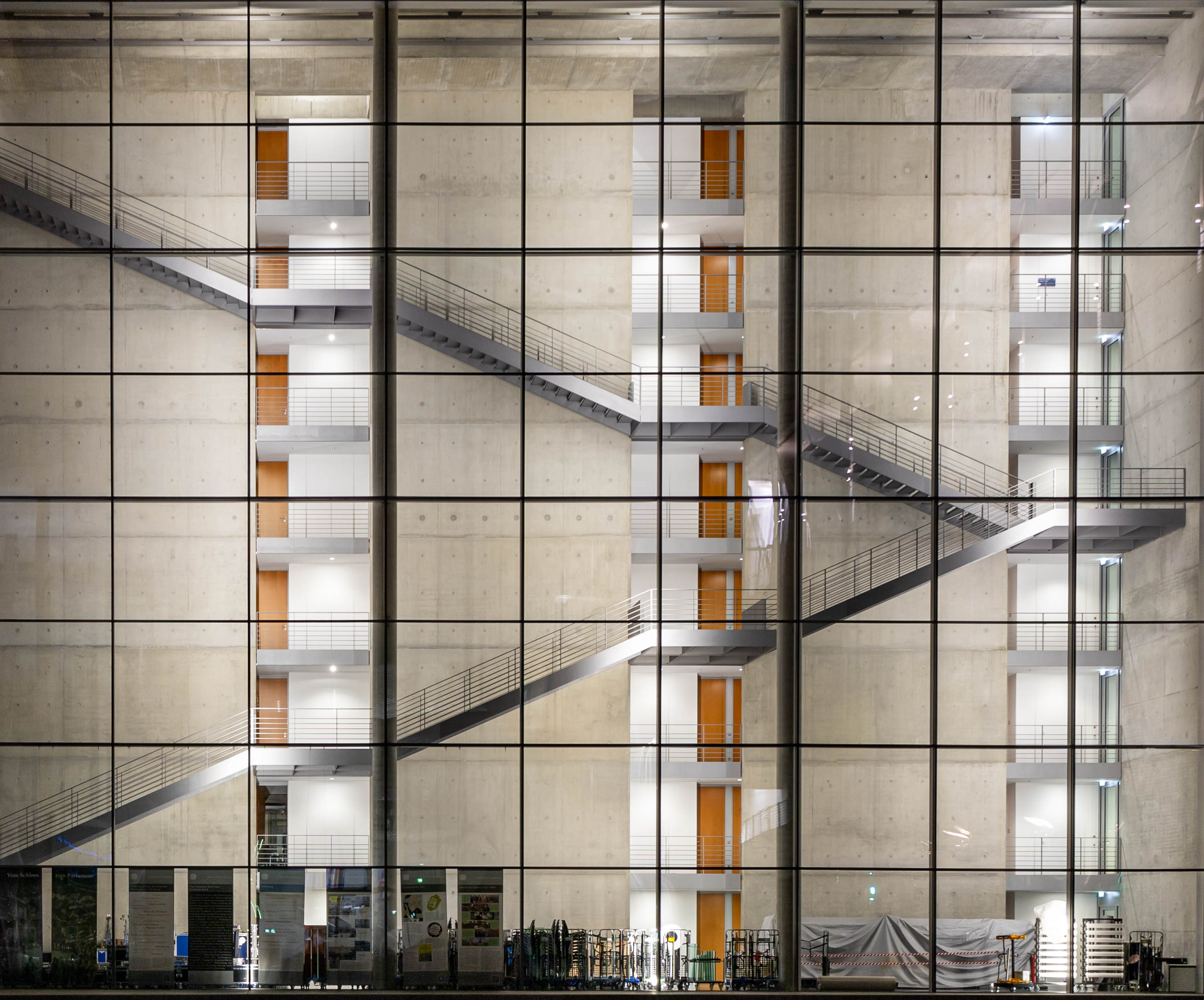
Stairways

=== Foyer ===
The foyer of the Paul Löbe House hosts, among other things, changing exhibitions, for example, "70 Years Between Nature and Society" by the German Meteorological Service from April to May 2023. In 2023, the exhibition "Home Street Home – Ways out of Homelessness" by photographer Debora Ruppert was shown here.

== Art ==
One of the northern courtyards houses a spatial installation by the artist Franka Hörnschemeyer. All the other side courtyards also feature art-in-architecture works, many of which dominate the spacious central hall, which intersects the entire building. Of particular note are the neon-lit colored bands by François Morellet and the text bands by Joseph Kosuth embedded in the hall floor. A large work by Helmut Federle hangs in the Europa Hall.

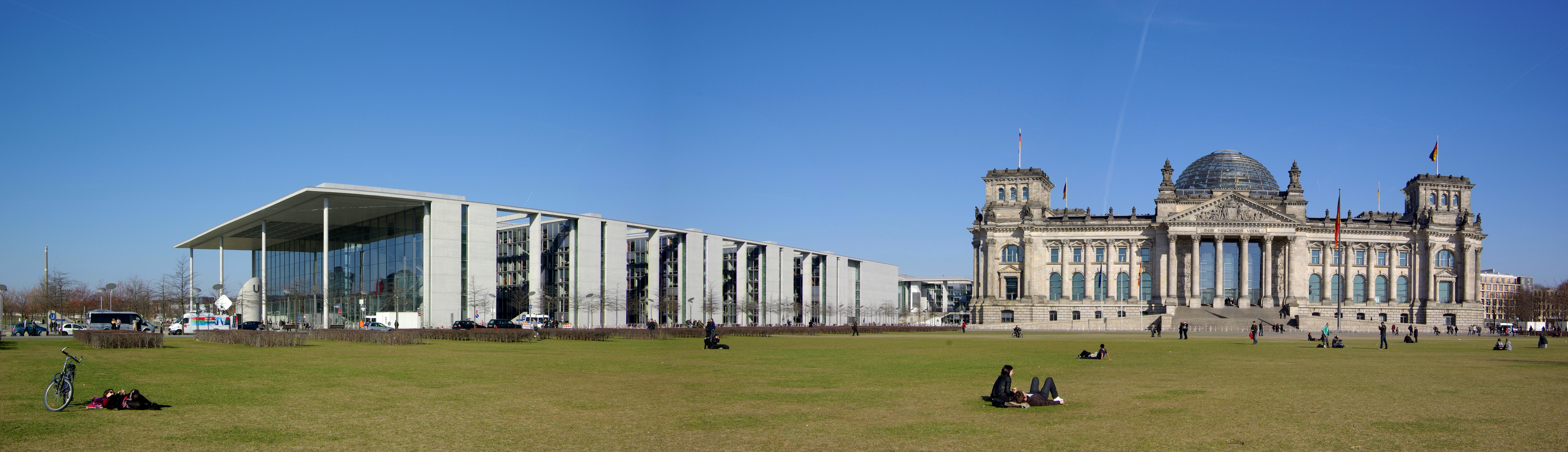
Paul-Löbe House (left) and the Reichstag (right)

== Bibliography ==
- Demokratie als Bauherr. Die Bauten des Bundes in Berlin 1991 bis 2000 (1st ed.). Junius Verlag. 2000. pp. 84–93. ISBN 3-88506-290-9.
