= Parliamentary office =

Parliamentary office may refer to:

== Australia ==
- Parliamentary Budget Office

== France ==
- Parliamentary Office for the Evaluation of Scientific and Technological Choices

== Germany ==
- Abgeordnetenbüro, parliamentary office in Germany

== United Kingdom ==
- Scottish Churches Parliamentary Office
- Parliamentary Office of Science and Technology

== See also ==
- Parliamentary Counsel Office
