= Leuphana (disambiguation) =

Leuphana may refer to:

- Leuphana, the Greek name for an ancient settlement, possibly the site of the modern German city of Lüneburg
- Lüneburg, the modern city possibly built on the site of ancient Leuphana
- Leuphana University Lüneburg, a university in the city of Lüneburg
