= Leuphana =

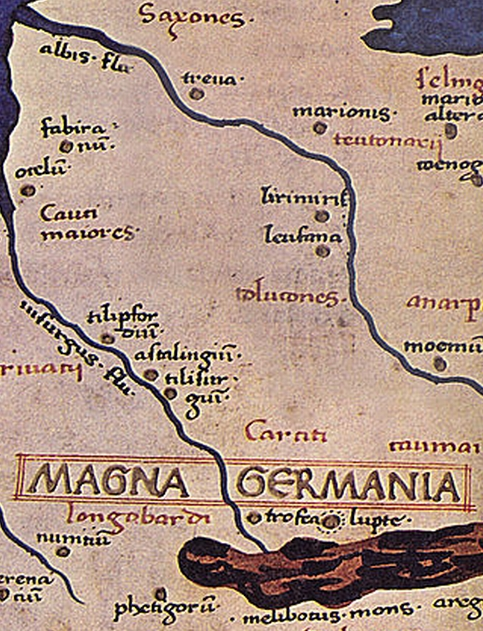

Leuphana (Λευφάνα) is a city name, first mentioned by Ptolemy in the year 150 in the Atlas Geographia.

Ptolemy mentioned in Geographica 2, that ten cities unified by their not being under Roman occupation, created a settlement named Leuphana. Johann Grässe put Leuphana in his place name dictionary on par with Lüneburg. Ptolemy mentioned a large number of German settlements that were not under Roman occupation, such as Ascalingium.

After Günnewig, Leuphana is located on the lowest stretch of the Elbe, although it is unknown on which side. Speculation is that Leuphana is near Hamburg, Dömitz (Mecklenburg), or in the area near Altmark.

However, identification of Leuphana is far from certain. Ptolemy may have been mistaken, as he was about Poleis. Grässe also may have been incorrect, both men confusing it with Levefanum, that was located on the left side of the Rhine. The nomenclature expert Jürgen Udolph has the opinion that Leuphana has nothing to do with Lüneburg. His opinion on the matter is supported by other nomenclature experts.

Research by the Institute for Geodesy of Technische Universität Berlin, into a geodesic deformation analysis of the Ptolemaic map concluded that Leuphana lies to the east of Lüneburg on the Elbe, located next to Hitzacker, which speaks in favor of the correctness of the Ptolemaic localization. This finding is supported through the archaeological excavations in Marwedel near Hitzacker, where the University of Göttingen and the Free University of Berlin and their archaeologists Olaf Fabian and Ivonne Baier located a settlement from the time period of 78/80 to 225. In 1928 and 1944, the graves of Chieftains from Marwedel were found, two elite tombs with rich grave offerings from the Germanic time of 150.

Since March 20, 2007, the University of Lüneburg has adopted the name Leuphana. The advertising agency Scholz and Friends of Hamburg proposed the name change to the university board in 2006.
