= Nett hier. Aber waren Sie schon mal in Baden-Württemberg? =

German advertising campaign

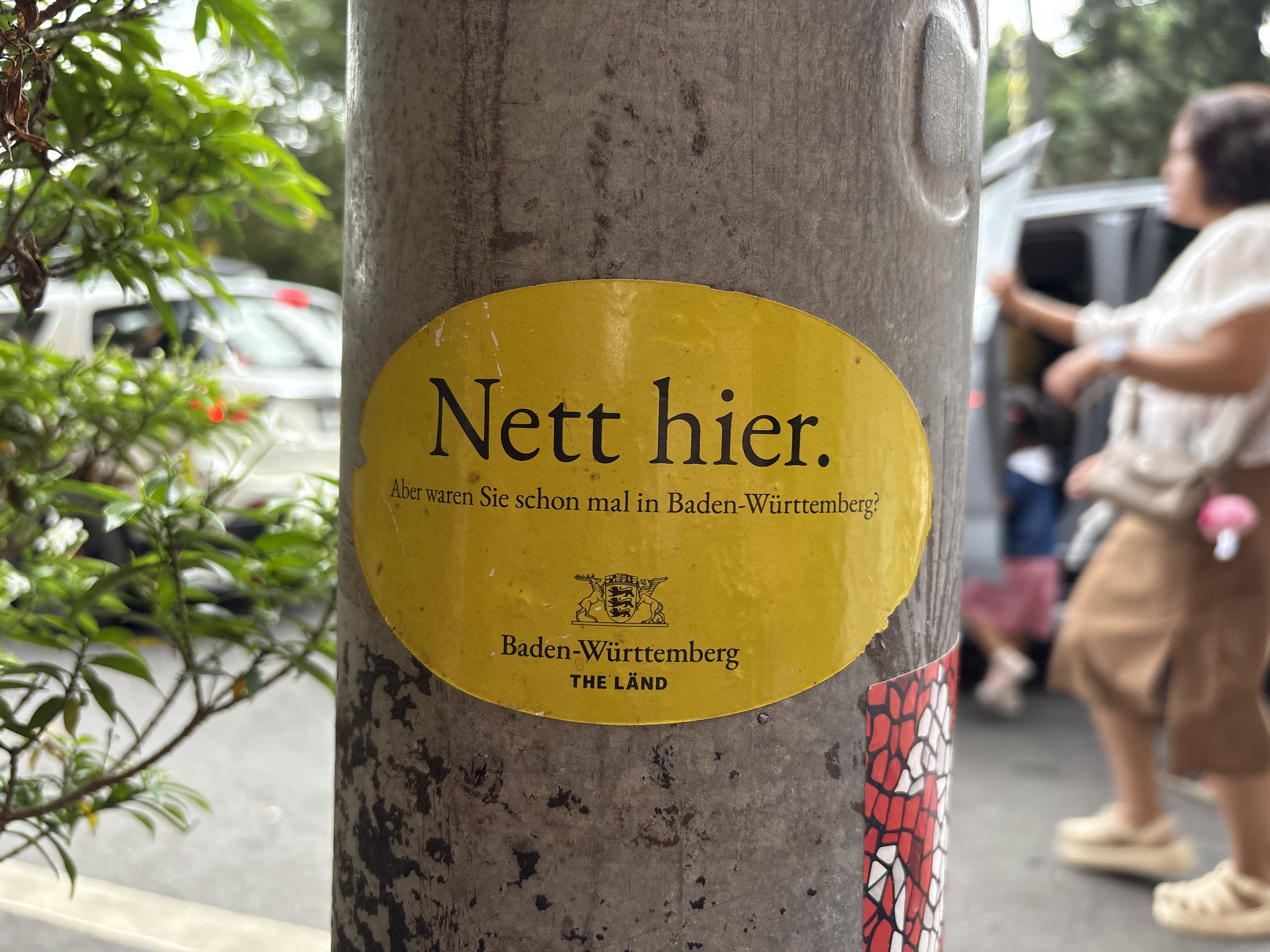
- A Nett hier sticker near the entry of the Wat Phra That Doi Suthep Temple in Chiang Mai, Thailand
- Agency: Scholz & Friends
- Client: Government of Baden-Württemberg
- Language: German
- Release date: 1999
- Country: Germany

"Nett hier. Aber waren Sie schon mal in Baden-Württemberg?" (English: Not bad. But have you ever been to Baden-Württemberg? (Note: "Not bad" appears on the official English language version of the stickers; the German "Nett hier" literally translates to "Nice here.")) is a slogan from a 1999 marketing campaign by Scholz & Friends for the German state of Baden-Württemberg. In later years, the slogan has been printed on stickers which have spread globally.

== See also ==
- Wir können alles. Außer Hochdeutsch.
- Sticker art
