= Abgeordnetenbüro =

The Abgeordnetenbüro (English: parliamentary office) is the office of a Member of the German Bundestag. This office is provided to the Member of Parliament by the Parliamentary Administration or must be rented by the Member of Parliament using Parliamentary funds.

It is different to the Wahlkreisbüro (English: constituency office).

== German Bundestag ==
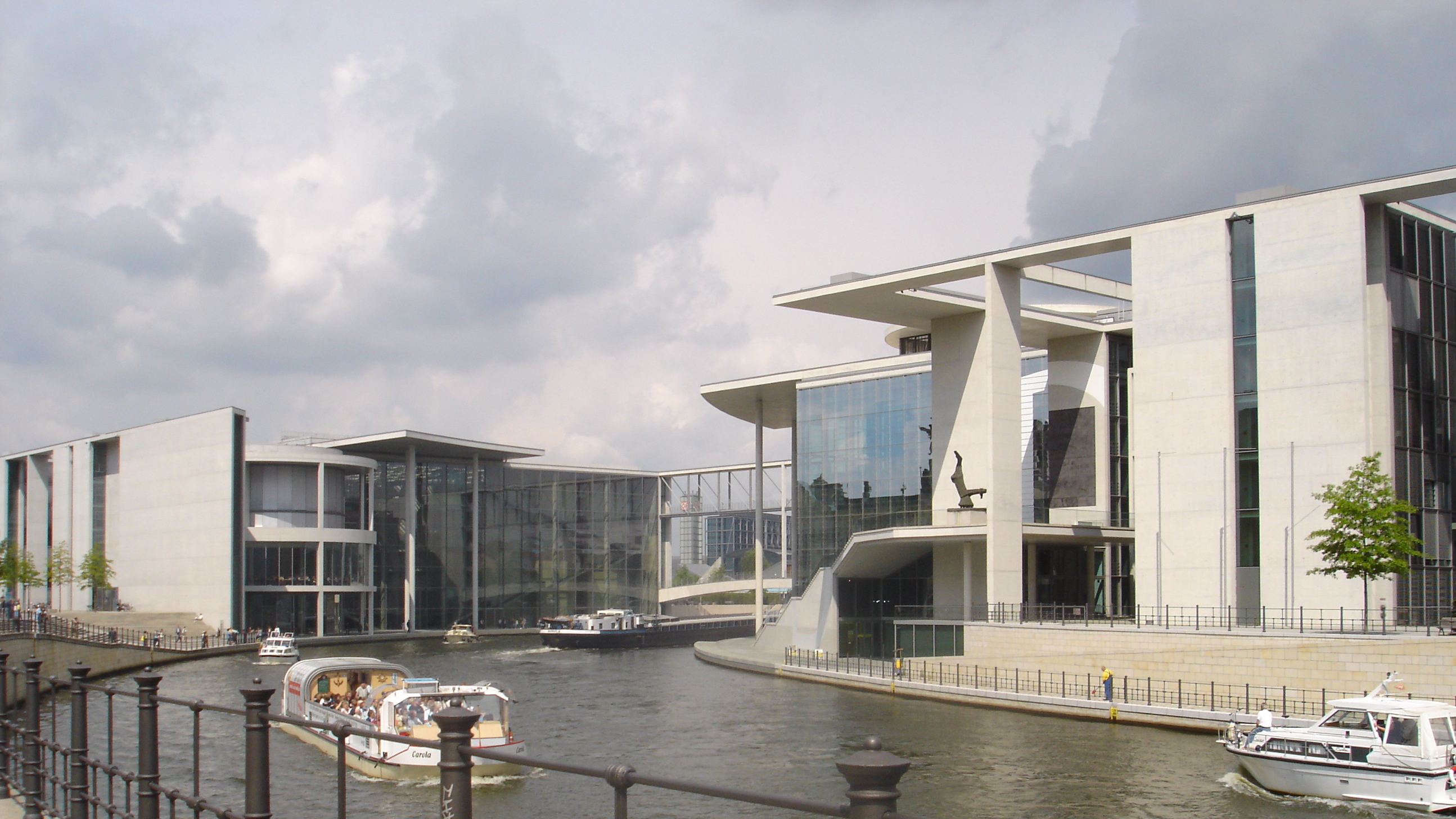
The Paul Löbe House and the Marie-Elisabeth Lüders House

According to Section 12, Paragraph 4, Sentence 1, No. 1 of the Bundestag Act (AbgG) , an office at the seat of the German Bundestag is part of the official equipment of every Member of the German Bundestag. Due to their constitutionally protected status as a member of parliament, a member's office is considered a space requiring particular protection. According to a ruling by the Federal Constitutional Court of 9 June 2020, members of parliament "have the right under Article 38, Paragraph 1, Sentence 2 of the Basic Law (GG) to use the premises assigned to them without interference from third parties."

The parliamentary office is to be distinguished from the parliamentary group rooms, which are provided by the Bundestag administration to the parliamentary groups for their staff and as meeting rooms. Furthermore, the parliamentary office is to be distinguished from the constituency office (Wahlkreisbüro), which is located in the respective member's constituency and serves as a point of contact with the public.

The office serves as a workplace for the respective MP and their personal staff, who support them in their parliamentary work. MPs' offices usually employ office managers, secretaries, administrative assistants, research assistants, or consultants. In addition, many MPs' offices offer the opportunity for employment as student assistants, student employees, or interns.

The MPs' offices are not located in the Reichstag building, but in the adjoining buildings, particularly the Jakob Kaiser House, Matthias Erzberger House, Otto Wels House, Paul Löbe House, and Luisenblock West. In the Jakob Kaiser House, which houses 60% of the MPs' offices and parliamentary group rooms, there are standard office rooms of 18 m² of which at least three are made available to each MP. The number of offices can increase if an MP is also, for example, the parliamentary group leader. The furnishings of the offices also vary.

== See also ==
- Wahlkreisbüro
