= Walk of Ideas =

Set of six sculptures in Berlin, Germany

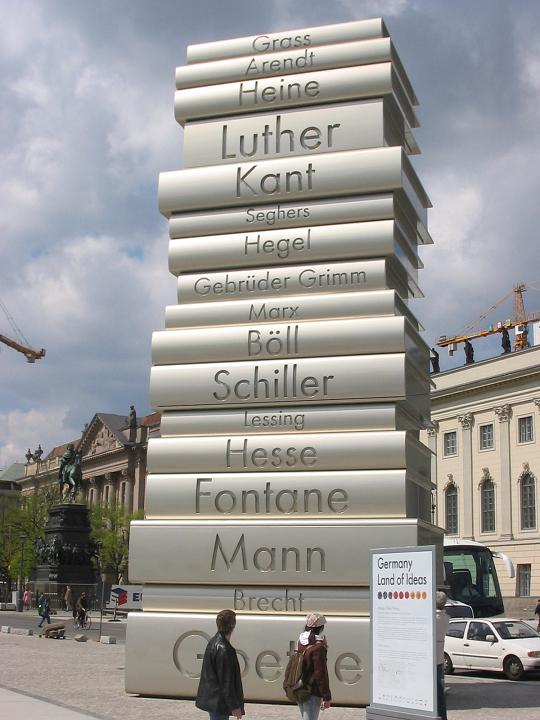
12-metre-high (40 ft) stack of books sculpture at the Berlin Walk of Ideas, commemorating the invention of modern book printing

The Walk of Ideas was a set of six sculptures in central Berlin designed by Scholz & Friends for the 2006 FIFA World Cup football event in Germany. The sculptures, part of a campaign called Welcome to Germany – the Land of Ideas, were put up between 10 March 2006 and 19 May 2006. The opening of the exhibition was covered by reporters for the international mass media. The sculptures were on display until September 2006.

== Background information ==
The "boulevard of sculptures" was a central component of a nation building campaign called "Deutschland – Land der Ideen" (Germany – Land of Ideas). The campaign, under the patronage of the then German President, Horst Köhler, was a collaboration between the German government and the German business sector, (represented by the Federation of German Industries), whose purpose was to communicate a positive image of Germany both nationally and internationally.

The campaign's corporate design, as well as the design of the sculptures, was developed and realized by the Berlin design agency Scholz & Friends Identify. The agency has since received multiple awards for this campaign (such as the renowned German EVA Award in 2006). The sculptures were placed on central squares (Bebelplatz and Gendarmenmarkt among others) in Berlin's city center. Many politicians, members of the initiative or representatives of the companies involved held speeches at the small opening ceremonies accompanying the unveiling of the sculptures. The first sculpture to be unveiled was "Der moderne Fußballschuh" (The Modern Football Boot), at Spreebogenpark on March 10, 2006. The final sculpture "Relativitätstheorie" (The Theory of Relativity) was unveiled and handed over on May 19, 2006, to the Berlin park Lustgarten. In autumn of 2006, the sculptures were removed again. One sculpture, Das Automobil, was transported to Munich; it is not certain if or how the other pieces of art have been recycled or used elsewhere.

From the planning stage to the finished pieces, the total cost per sculpture lay between 300,000 and 350,000 euros. The sculptures were all built using the modern synthetic material Neopor, and coated with a special brilliant white varnish. The production time for each sculpture was roughly two months, with the final assembly on site spanning 2–3 days.

Plaques in both German and English provided explanatory details on the symbolism of each object along a path exemplifying Germany's research landscape and cultural history.

== Sculptures ==
=== Modern Book Printing ===
The installation of the statue "Der moderne Buchdruck" (Modern Book Printing) took place on April 21, 2006, at Bebelplatz opposite Humboldt University. The assembly of this 12.2-metre-high (40 ft) object on the street Unter den Linden took three days.

A steel structure held 17 different-sized shell segments together; each of them representing a single book. Including the stabilizing ballast weight, the tower ended up with an overall weight of 35 tonnes (39 short tons).

The 17 books were stacked on their sides and bore the names of German poets and writers on their spines; Goethe formed the base as the lowermost book. The sculpture was erected in remembrance of Johannes Gutenberg who invented the modern letterpress in Mainz around 1450 and created the first bestseller in history with the Gutenberg Bible. Of the approximately 180 original copies of the first edition, 48 are known to still exist.

Here is the full list of names on each spine, beginning with the topmost book:

- Günter Grass
- Hannah Arendt
- Heinrich Heine
- Martin Luther
- Immanuel Kant
- Anna Seghers
- Georg Wilhelm Friedrich Hegel
- The Brothers Grimm
- Karl Marx
- Heinrich Böll
- Friedrich Schiller
- Gotthold Ephraim Lessing
- Hermann Hesse
- Theodor Fontane
- Thomas and Heinrich Mann
- Bertolt Brecht
- Johann Wolfgang von Goethe
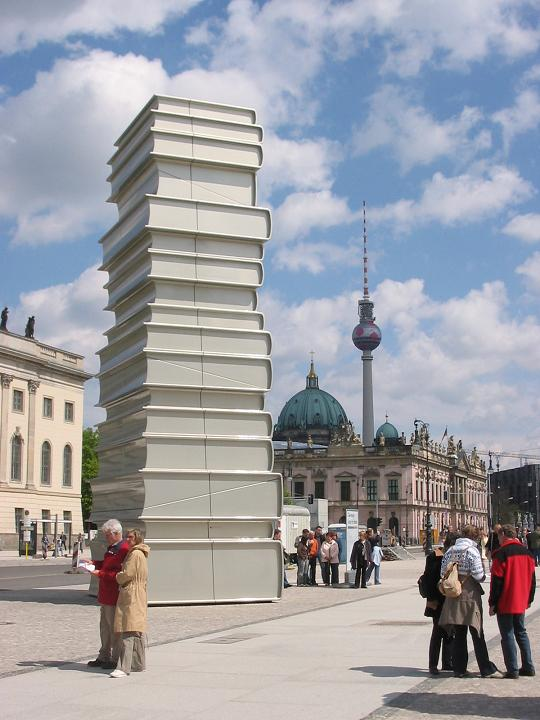

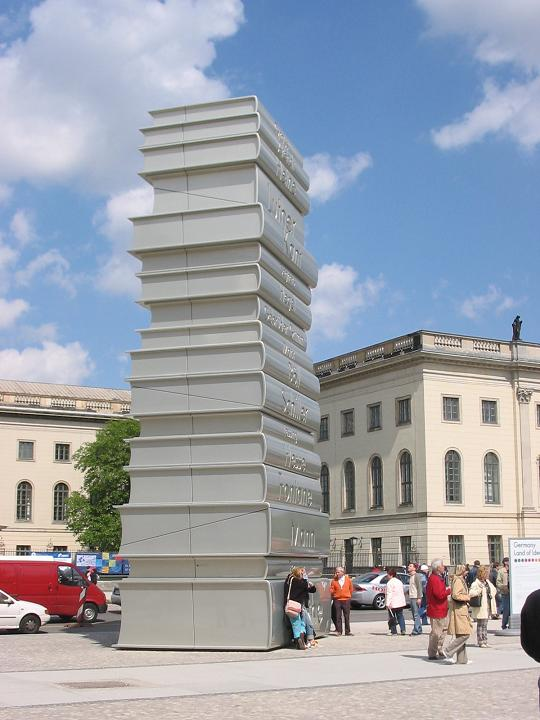

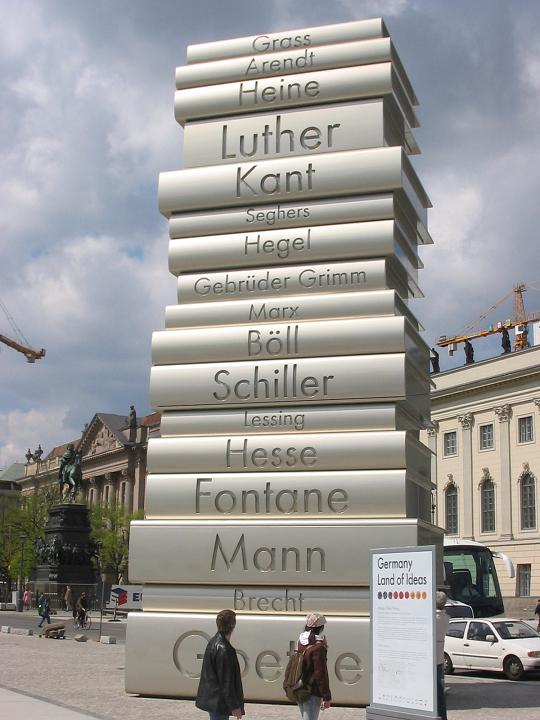

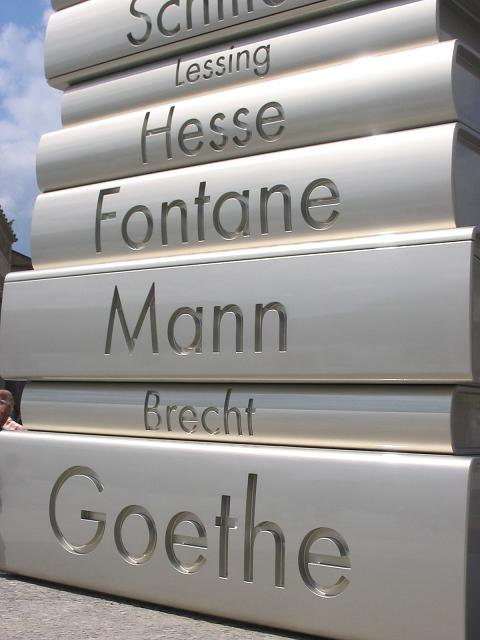

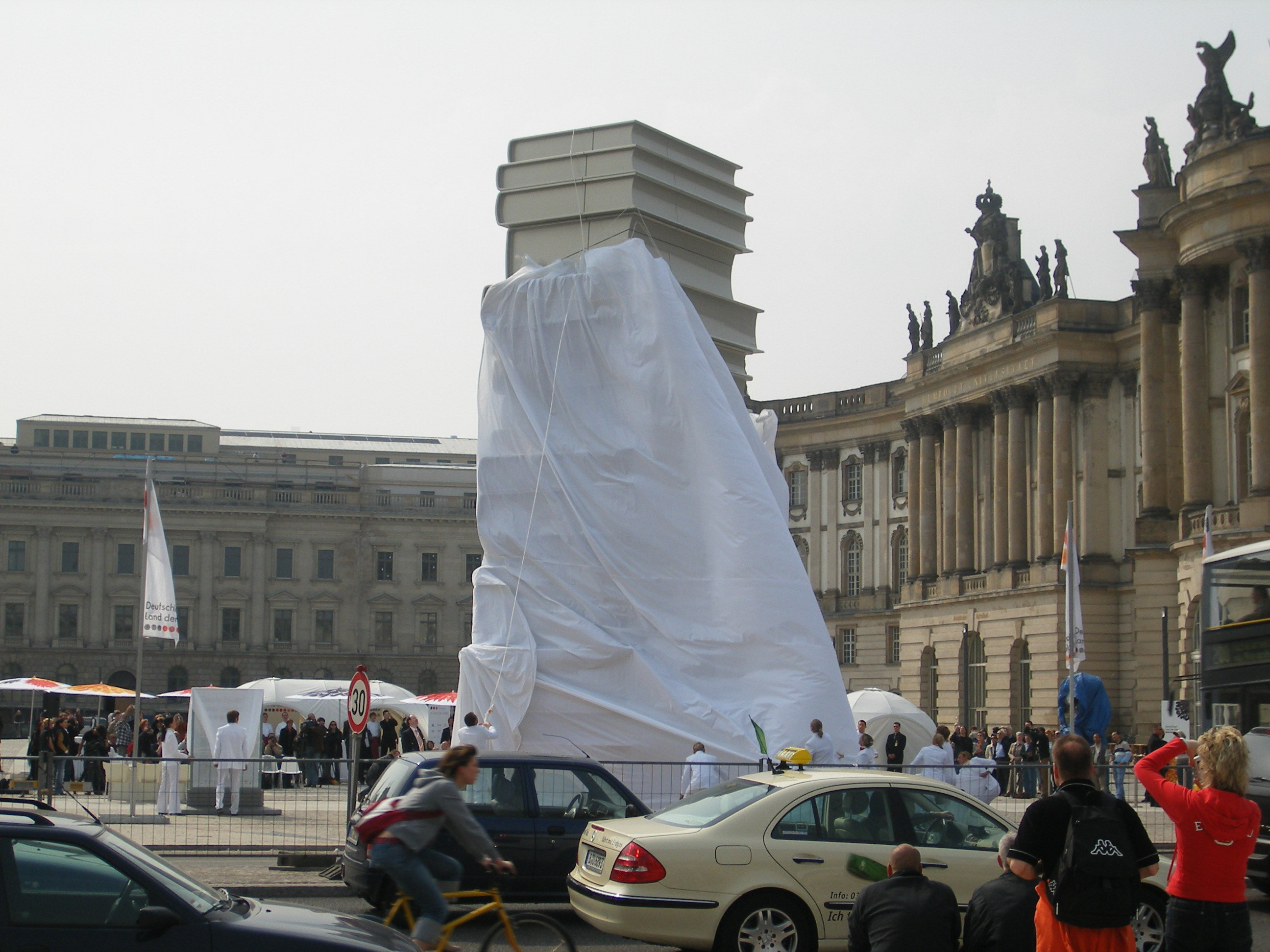

=== Milestones of Medicine ===
The ceremonial inauguration of the sculpture Milestones of Medicine took place on March 30, 2006, at the Friedrich-Ebert-Platz which is located just east of the Reichstag. It was in the shape of a pill and, with a diameter of 10 m (33 feet), was impossible to overlook on the waterside promenade of the Spree across the Marie-Elisabeth-Lüders-Haus which houses the Library of the German Parliament. The 25-tonne (28-short-ton) sculpture was anchored below the pavement by a steel base which measured 4.20 m × 4.20 m × 1.00 m (13.78 by 13.78 by 3.28 feet).

The sculpture was intended to symbolise breakthrough pharmaceutical research, such as that done by Felix Hoffmann, Robert Koch, Emil Adolf von Behring, Paul Ehrlich or Gerhard Domagk. In 1897, pharmacist and chemist Felix Hoffmann managed to process acetylsalicylic acid (ASA) that was chemically pure and stable as well as well tolerated for patients. The product came onto the market two years later under the name of Aspirin and constitutes the active ingredient of many other painkillers today. In 1950, Aspirin was listed in the Guinness Book of Records as the best-selling painkiller.

Additionally the giant pill on the Spree riverside was meant to be a reminder of medical equipment like the X-ray tube, the Cardiac catheter and dialysis which are German developments. The pill symbolises Germany as one of the world leaders in pharmaceutics and medical technology.

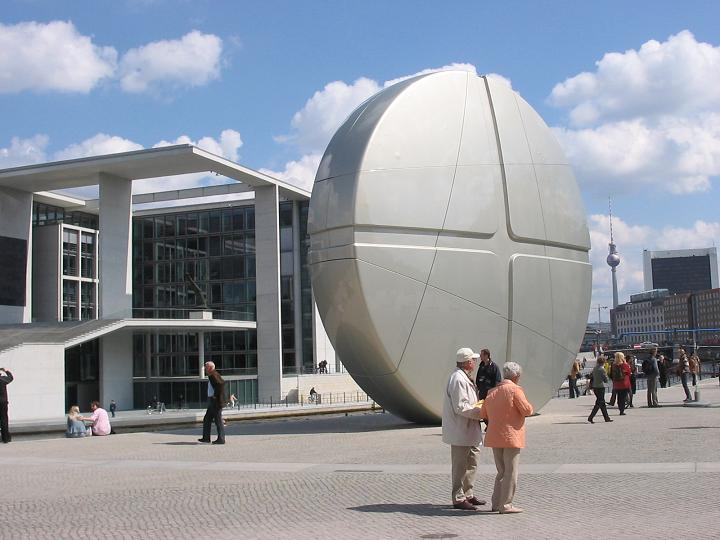

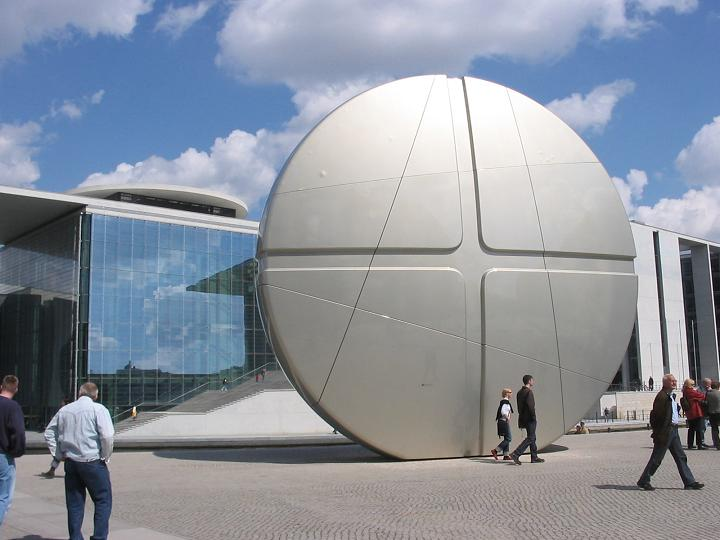

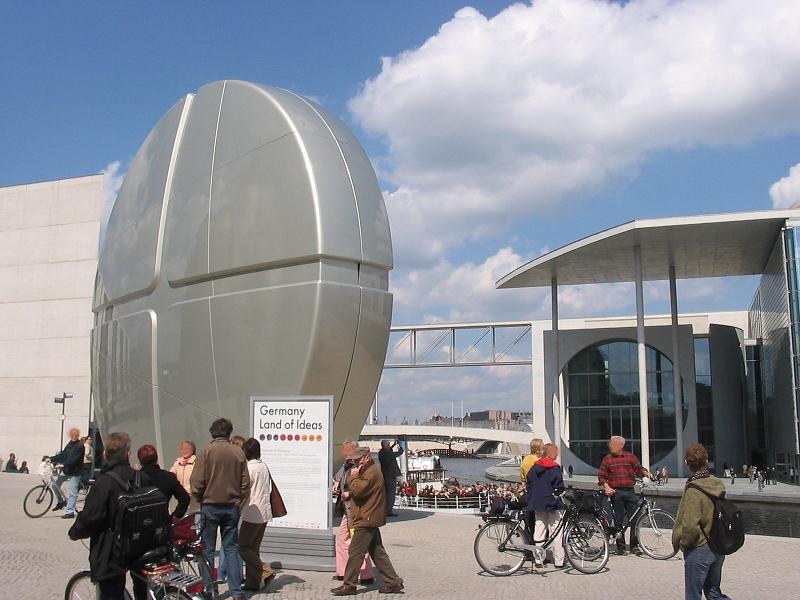

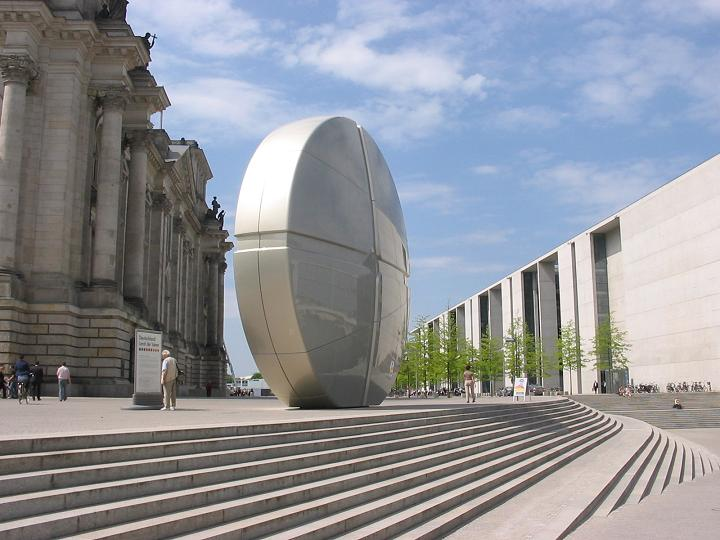

=== Masterpieces of Music ===
The sculpture "Meisterwerke der Musik" (Masterpieces of Music) consisted of six individual notes, three quavers and three crotchets. Each note was 8.10 m (26.6 feet) high, 5.4 m (18 feet) long and 2.1 m (6.9 feet) wide and weighed 8.6 tonnes (9.5 short tons), including the flag. According to the website Land der Ideen (Country of Ideas) the notes were, due to their static and geometric aspects, by far the most complicated construction of all six sculptures. A crane was used to assemble the individual parts, the note heads and stems, on May 5, 2006, at the Gendarmenmarkt.

The notes were intended to represent the importance of music for Germany - of composers like Johann Sebastian Bach, Ludwig van Beethoven, Johannes Brahms, or Richard Wagner, of pioneers like Karlheinz Stockhausen, and of artists such as Anne-Sophie Mutter. The compositional work covers serious religious music and powerful symphonic pieces as well as a variety of cheerful elements. For example, in "Kaffeekantate" Bach depicted a humorous scene exploring the bourgeois life of the middle class in Leipzig of that time.

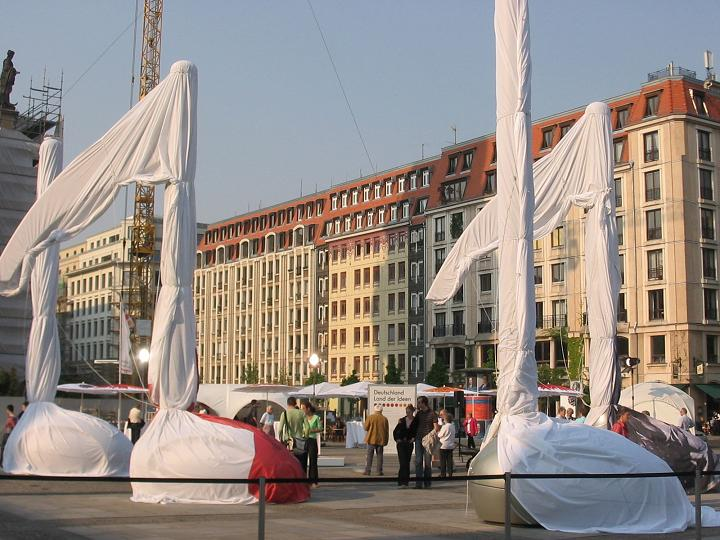

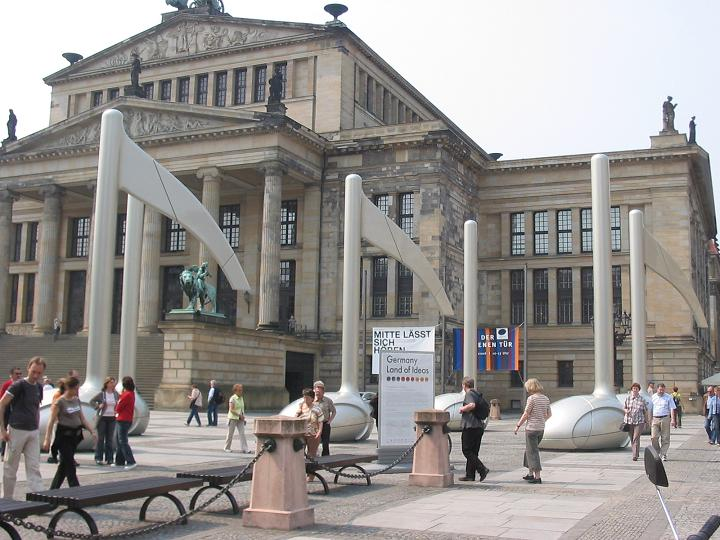

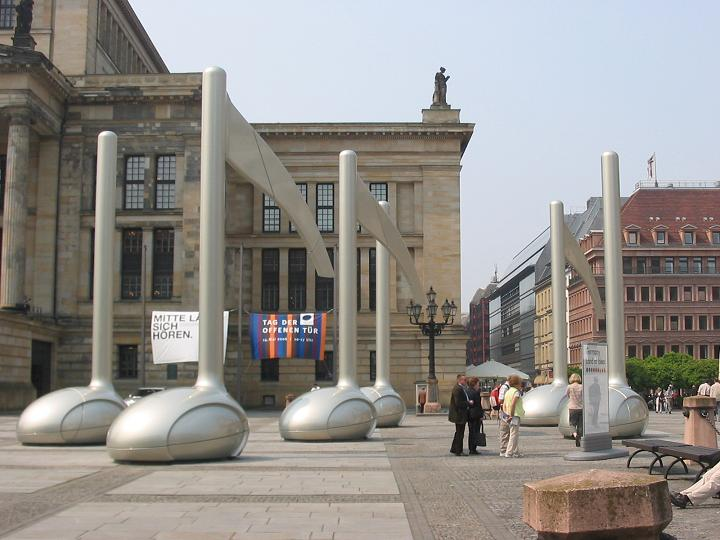

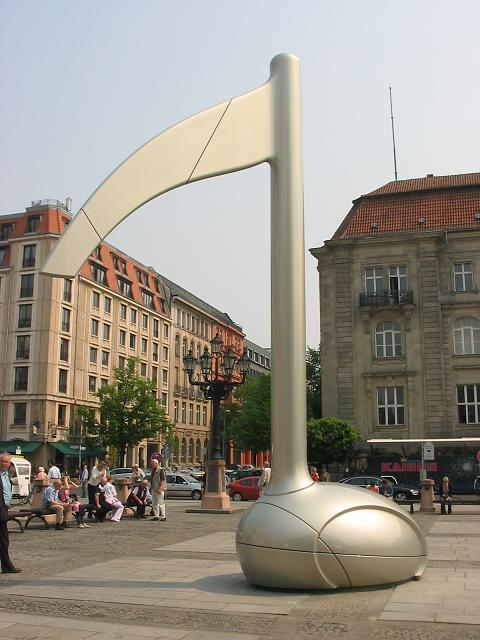

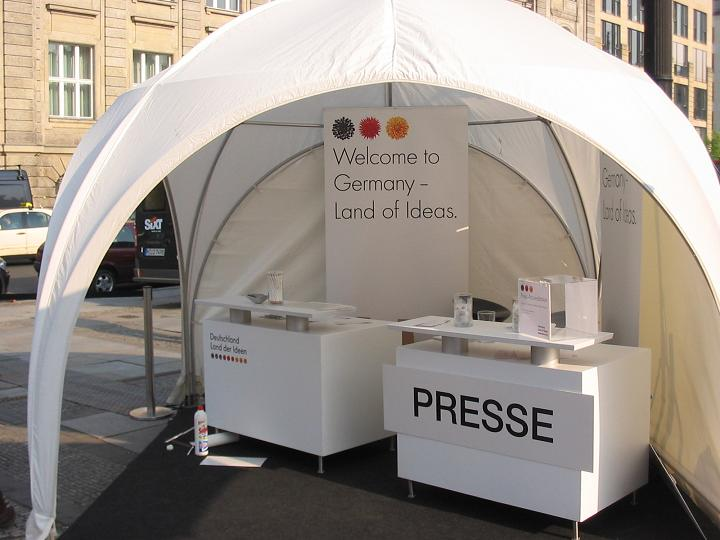

=== The Automobile ===
It is 10.2 m (33 feet) long, 4.5 m (15 feet) wide and 3.25 m (10.7 feet) high, weighing more than 10 metric tons (22,000 lb). Using 1,000 m^{2} (11,000 square feet) of glass fiber reinforced plastic lining and 120 m^{3} (32,000 US gallons; 26,000 imperial gallons) of Neopor foam, the sculpture Das Automobil comprises 16 steel segments on a steel frame. The sculpture was designed by the German car manufacturer Audi. More than 100 people were involved in the making. The public interest was high when the sculpture was unveiled on the western side of the Brandenburg Gate on April 6, 2006. Besides the mayor Klaus Wowereit, 600 guests, 100 photographers, TV crews and journalists took part in the celebrations.

In May 2006, the sculpture was relocated to the Schloßplatz in order to make room for the FIFA Fan Fest during the 2006 FIFA World Cup.

The automobile sculpture was chosen to represent Karl Benz, Gottlieb Daimler, Wilhelm Maybach, August Horch, Ferdinand Porsche, and Rudolf Diesel, the inventor of the diesel engine.

According to an announcement by the team behind the national marketing campaign "Deutschland – Land der Ideen", Professor Martin Winterkorn unveiled the sculpture in front of the Oriental Plaza business center in Beijing on November 18, 2006, the evening before the "Auto China 2006" exhibition. The sculpture, Das Automobil, was on public display for 4 weeks. China's most prominent figures in society, sport, and culture were part of the approximately 250 invited guests at the unveiling, which, according to a news release, was a "spectacular show."

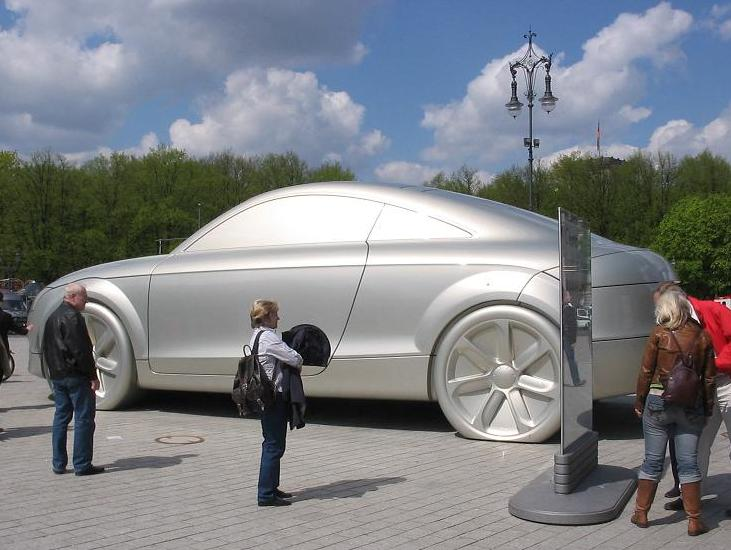

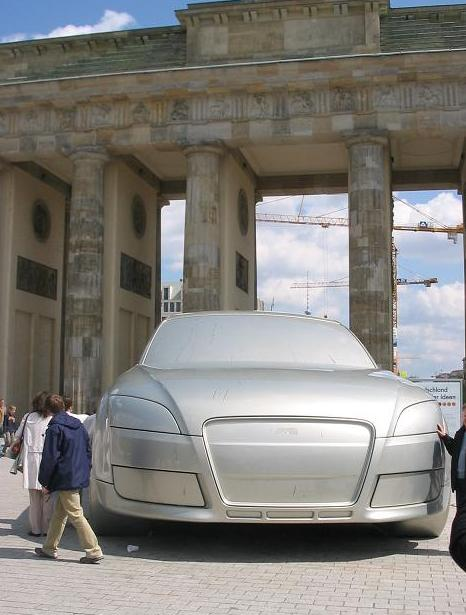

=== The Modern Football Boot ===
On March 10, 2006, the organisers of the "Boulevard of sculptures" unveiled the first statue, The Modern Football Boot in the Spreebogenpark opposing the new central station. The sculpture was built by the company EDAG Ltd. in Fulda. It depicts a pair of modern soccer shoes, as developed by the Dassler family.

In 1953, Adolf Dassler (the founder of Adidas) developed soccer shoes with flexible screw-in studs that provided a particularly firm grip on soft, rain-soaked ground. This development revolutionized soccer equipment. The Germany national football team wore these shoes during the World Cup which saw their victory in 1954 in Bern (Switzerland). The shoes are said to have contributed to their success. Otto Schily, former Federal Minister of the Interior and a member of the initiative's advisory committee, expressed his hopes for the upcoming World Cup 2006 after the unveiling: "Maybe Adidas has another "secret weapon" ready for this World Cup."

Each of the sculptured shoes was 14 m (46 feet) long, 4.5 m (15 feet) high and weighed around 20 tonnes (22 short tons). At the day of the unveiling, there was heavy snowfall in the area considering the season. Because of that, the Spreebogenpark looked more like a winter sports paradise than a green soccer turf.

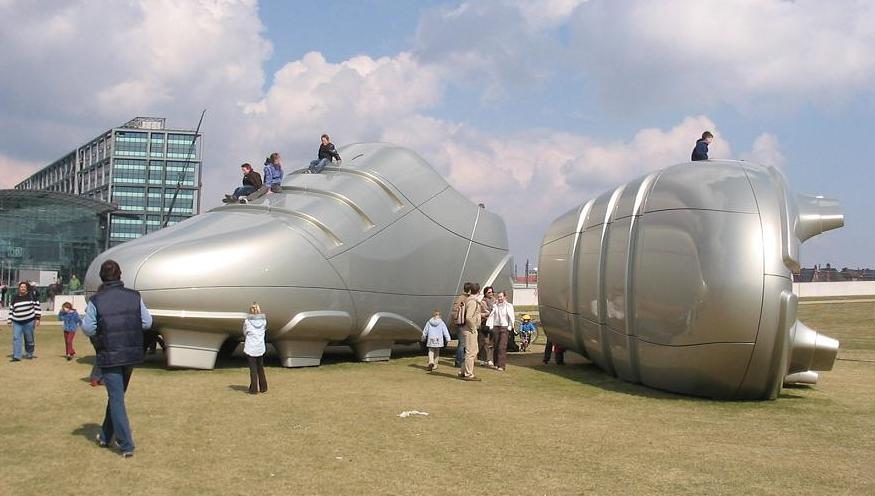

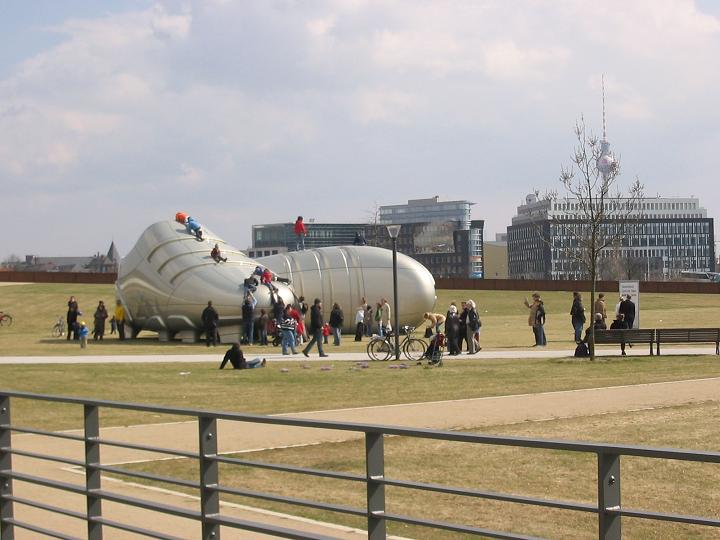

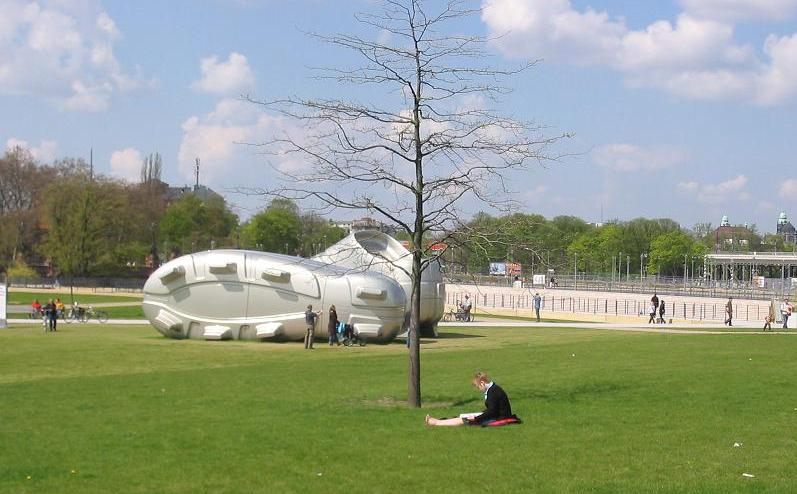

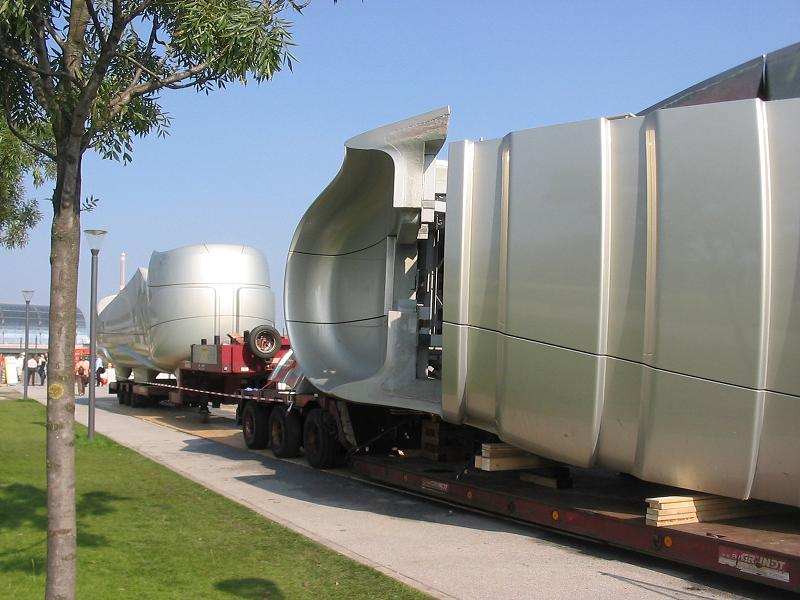

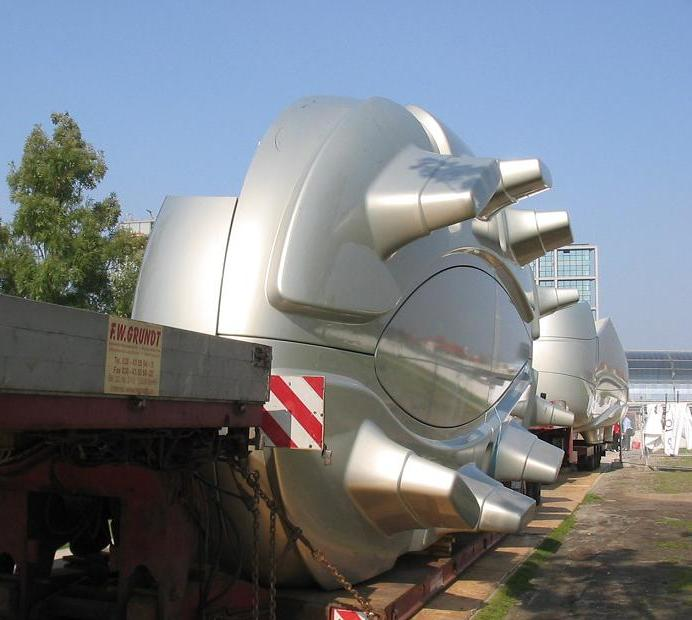

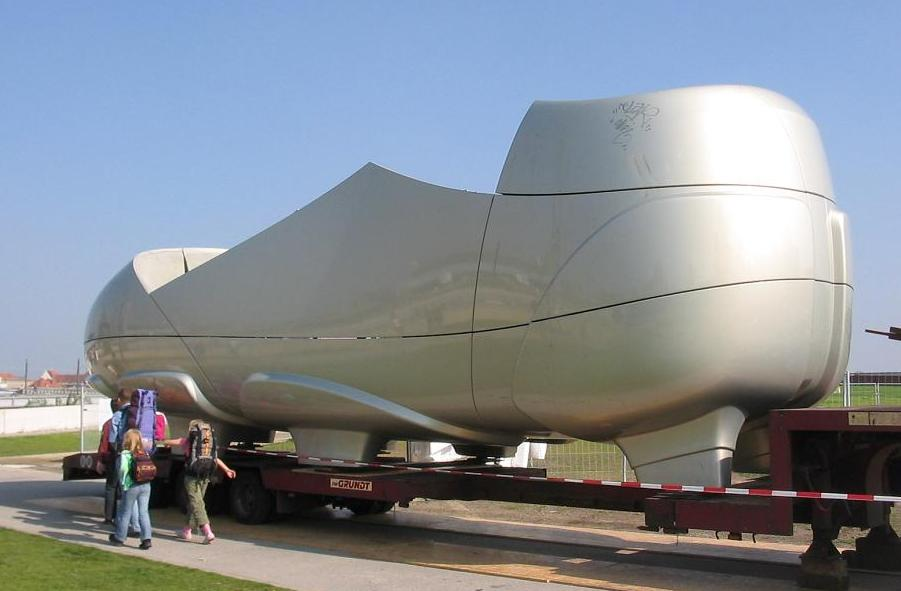

=== Theory of Relativity ===
The last sculpture depicts what is probably the most well-known equation in physics: E=mc². It belongs to the revolutionizing papers of Albert Einstein concerning the Theory of Relativity. In 1905, his paper "Zur Elektrodynamik bewegter Körper" ("The electrodynamics of objects in motion") established the Special Theory of Relativity, which revolutionized the understanding of space and time. In 1915, he published the General Theory of Relativity, in which the curvature of spacetime brings about gravity.

Nowadays, Albert Einstein is seen by many as the epitome of a scientist and a genius. He also used his fame outside of the scientific community in his efforts to further international understanding and peace. In this context he also considered himself a pacifist, socialist and Zionist.

The sculpture consisted of three segments. It weighed ten tonnes (11 short tons), was twelve metres (39 ft) long and four metres (13 ft) high. The ceremonial unveiling in Berlin took place on May 19, 2006, in the Lustgarten on Museum Island.

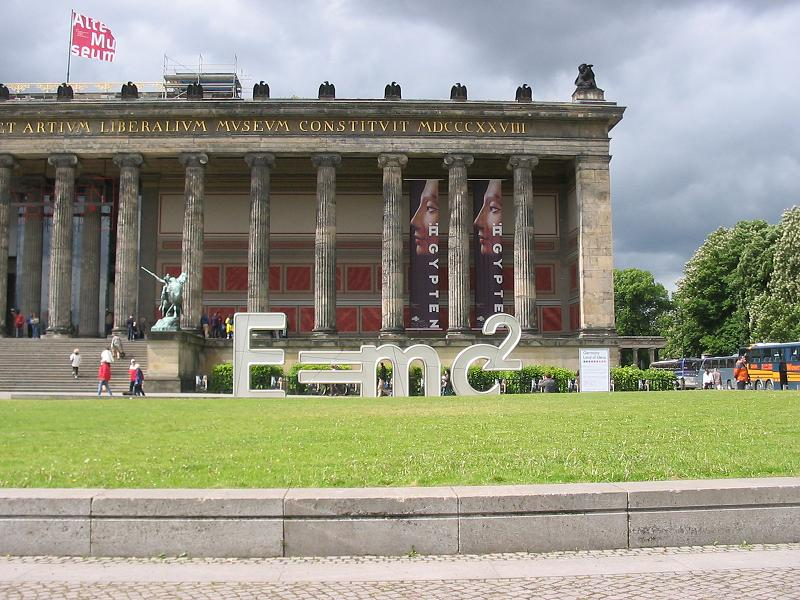

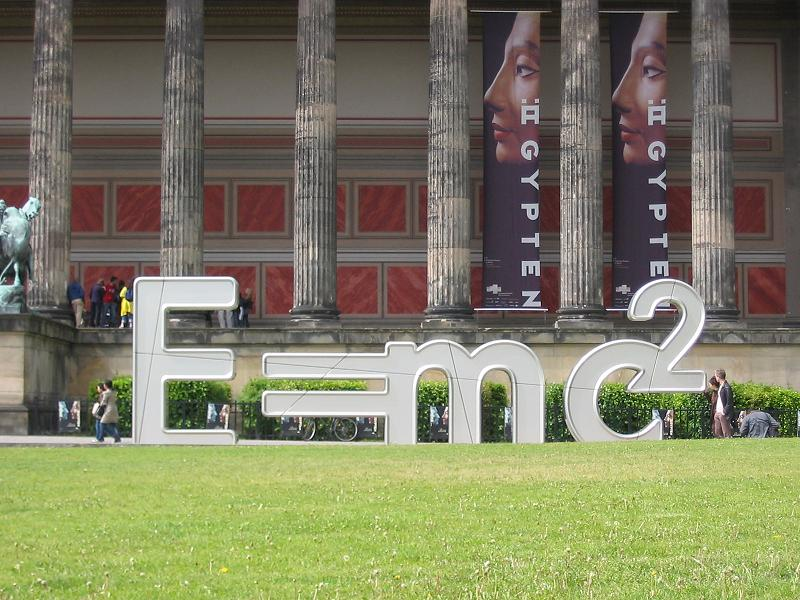

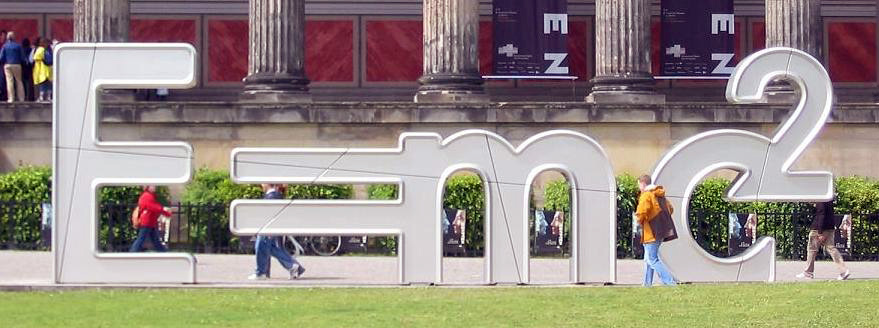

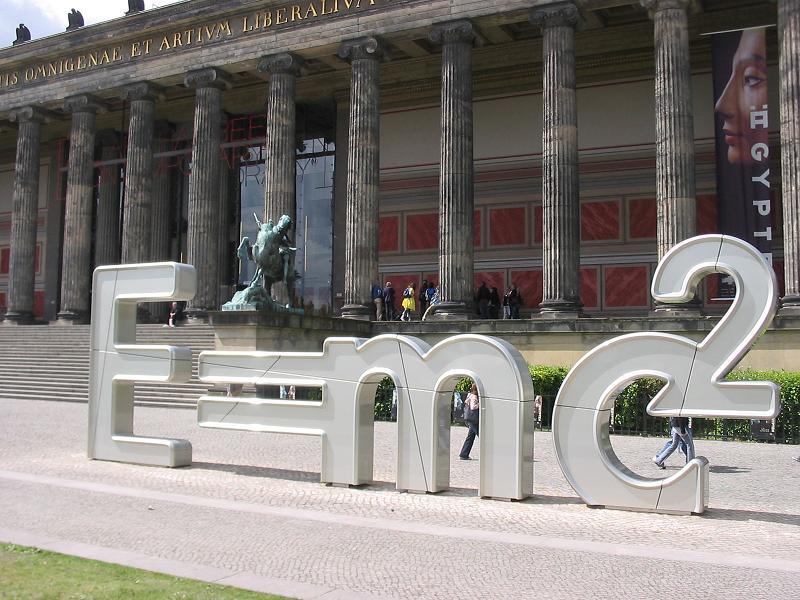

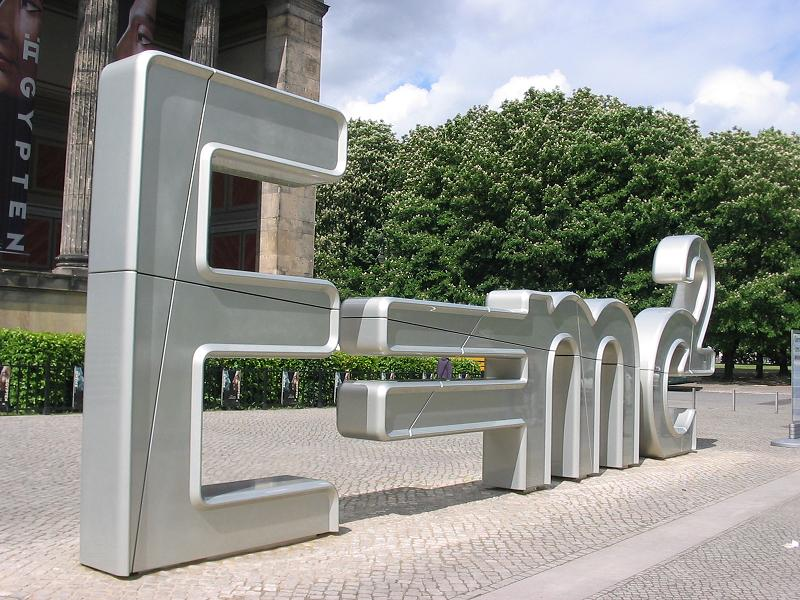

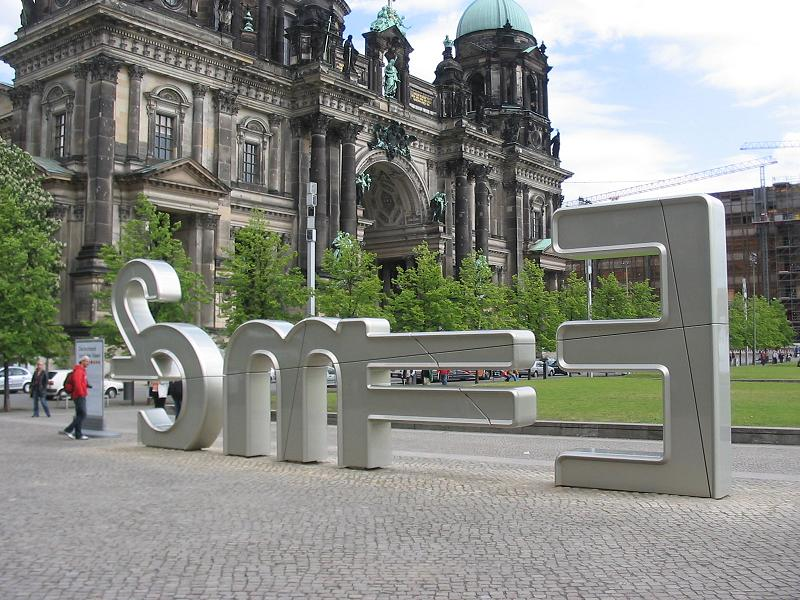
