= PCOS (disambiguation) =

Polycystic ovary syndrome, or PCOS, is the former name for polyendocrine metabolic ovarian syndrome (PMOS), an endocrine disorder.

PCOS may also refer to:

== Medicine ==
- Palliative Care Outcome Scale, a pain scale

== Computer operating systems ==
- PC OS, the operating system for a personal computer
- PC/OS, or Black Lab Linux, a Linux distribution
- Olivetti's Professional Computer Operating System, such as on the Olivetti M20

== Other meanings ==
- Comunitarian Party Option Seven (Spanish: Partido Comunitario Opción Siete), a political party in Colombia
- Precinct count optical scan, a voting machine
- Philharmonic Chamber Orchestra Society, now The Philharmonic Orchestra, Singapore

== See also ==
- PCO (disambiguation)
