= Constituency office =

Office run by a political representative

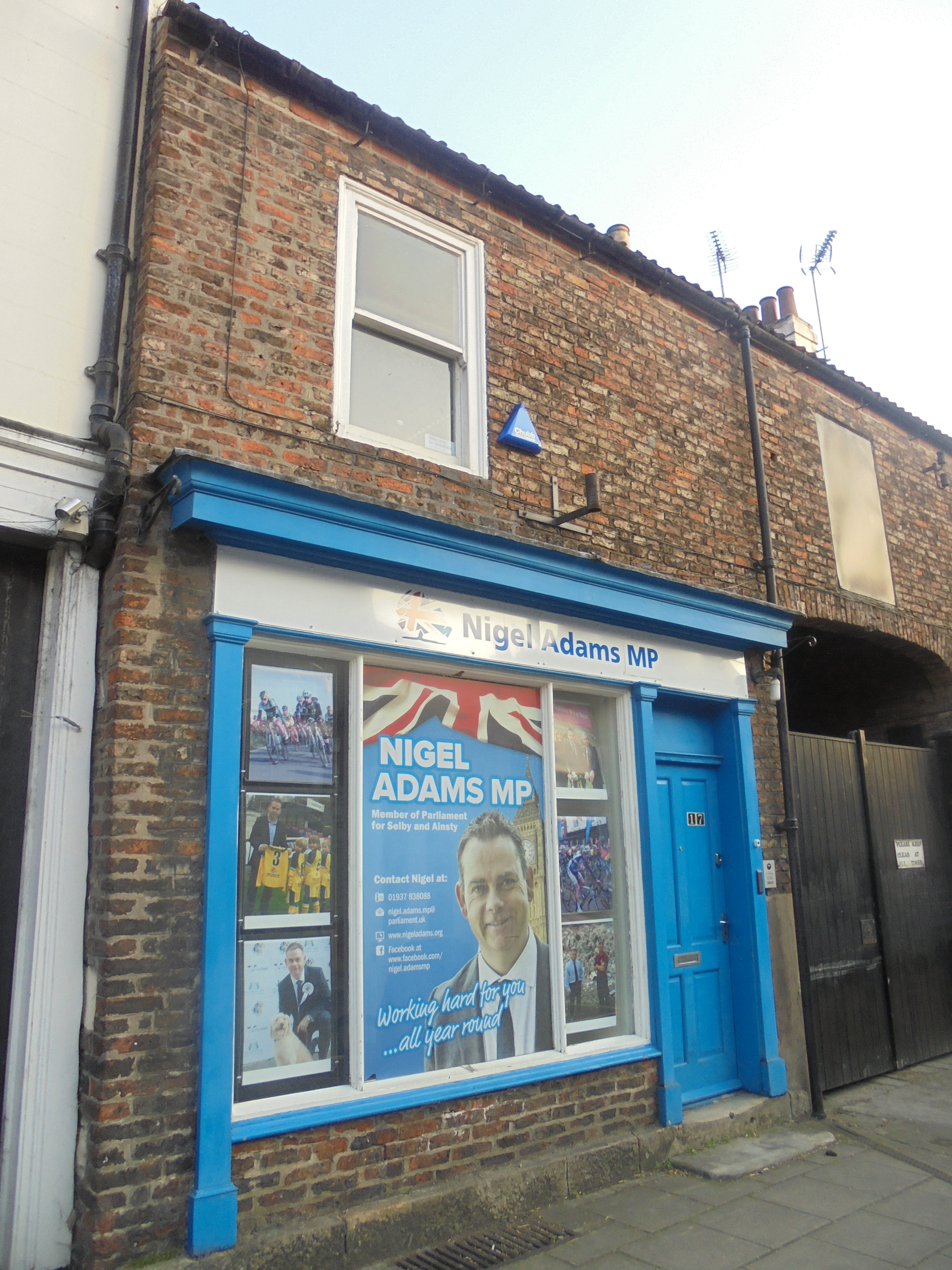
The constituency office of British MP Nigel Adams in Tadcaster, 2019

A constituency office, also called an electorate office, is an office operated by a local political officeholder, such as a Member of Parliament (MP), within the area they represent. It may be used to have meetings with constituents, or administration for the officeholder. It can serve a similar function to a surgery, but is normally based in a fixed office. Sometimes officeholders may also have offices in or around the legislature they serve in, which may serve a similar function but are normally not in the officeholder's constituency.

== Australia ==
Members of the House of Representatives are entitled to between one and three electorate offices depending upon the size of their constituency, while members of the Senate are each entitled to one office.

== Canada ==
Some Members of Provincial Parliaments (MPPs) in Canada, for example in the Legislative Assembly of Ontario, maintain constituency offices.

== Germany ==
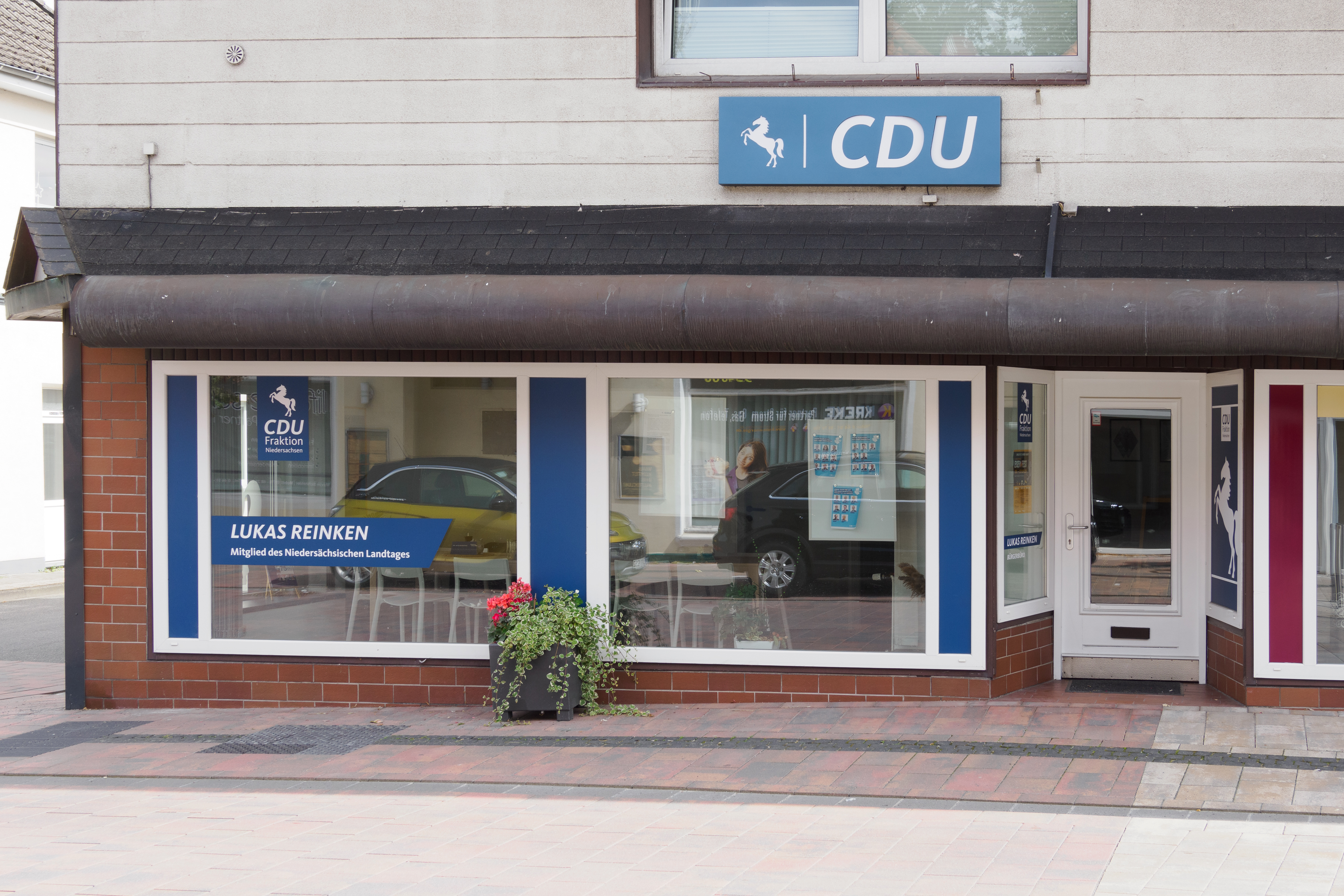
Constituency office of Lukas Reinken in Friesoythe, Lower Saxony

Constituency offices (German: Wahlkreisbüros) are maintained by members of the Bundestag and the state parliaments, although they are not obligated to do so. By law, members of the Bundestag receive a monthly flat rate to maintain the constituency office.

If a member of parliament sets up a constituency office, its documents are protected in the same way as in the member's office (Abgeordnetenbüro) in the German Bundestag.

Politicians have condemned vandalism and attacks on constituency offices.

== Ireland ==
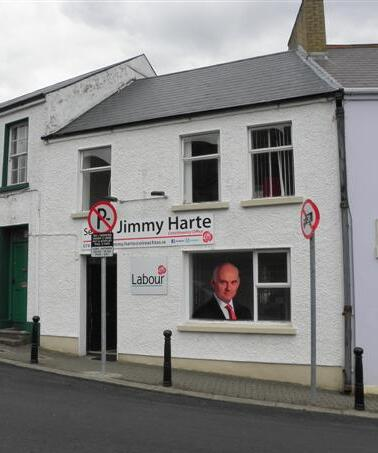
Constituency office of former Labour senator, Jimmy Harte, in Letterkenny, County Donegal

It is common, in Ireland, for TDs to maintain constituency offices. These offices are maintained in the TDs' home constituency, and are covered by a "constituency office establishment allowance", and other allowances for some of the costs in running the office.

In January 2024, the constituency office of TD Holly Cairns was reportedly closed due to "safety concerns". In February 2024, the office of Offaly TD Carol Nolan was vandalised.

== New Zealand ==
All members of the New Zealand Parliament are entitled to an electorate office, and two electoral secretaries. Although there is nothing requiring MPs to have an electorate office, taxpayer-funded electorate secretaries are not allowed to work out of Parliament buildings. After hers was attacked in 2022, Prime Minister Jacinda Arden described their use as "they help them [constituents] with housing issues, immigration issues, welfare issues" and that such issues were happening "consistently".

In 1996 Labour list MPs announced that they would begin to set up parliamentary offices.

== Tonga ==
The establishment of constituency offices was approved by the Tongan Parliament in 2019.

== United Kingdom ==
Constituency offices are common in the UK, especially for established MPs. Unlike surgeries, where 'drop-in' sessions are common, some meetings in constituency offices may require booking.

Offices are regulated by the Independent Parliamentary Standards Authority, which provides support with rent, deposits, and valuation. Most MPs have a constituency office and a Westminster office, although not all.

Following the murder of Jo Cox in 2016, MPs were reportedly offered access to additional security measures for their homes and constituency offices, leading to an increase in spending on such measures up to 2018.

Members of the devolved Northern Ireland Assembly, Scottish Parliament, and Welsh Parliament can also maintain constituency offices.
