= Scholz & Friends =

German advertising agency

- Type: GmbH
- Industry: Advertising
- Genre: Advertising agency
- Founded: 1981
- Founder: Jürgen Scholz, Uwe Lang and Michael Menzel
- Headquarters: Hamburg and Berlin, Germany
- Key people: Frank-Michael Schmidt (CEO)
- Revenue: 93,12 million € (2006)
- Number of employees: ca. 1000
- Parent: WPP plc
- Website: www.s-f.com

Scholz & Friends is one of Europe's largest advertising agencies. The company was founded in Hamburg by Jürgen Scholz, Uwe Lang and Michael Menzel in 1981. Today, the company has dual headquarters in Hamburg-HafenCity and Berlin-Mitte. Scholz & Friends started a joint venture with Commarco which was acquired by WPP in 2011.

== Campaigns ==
=== Baden-Württemberg ===
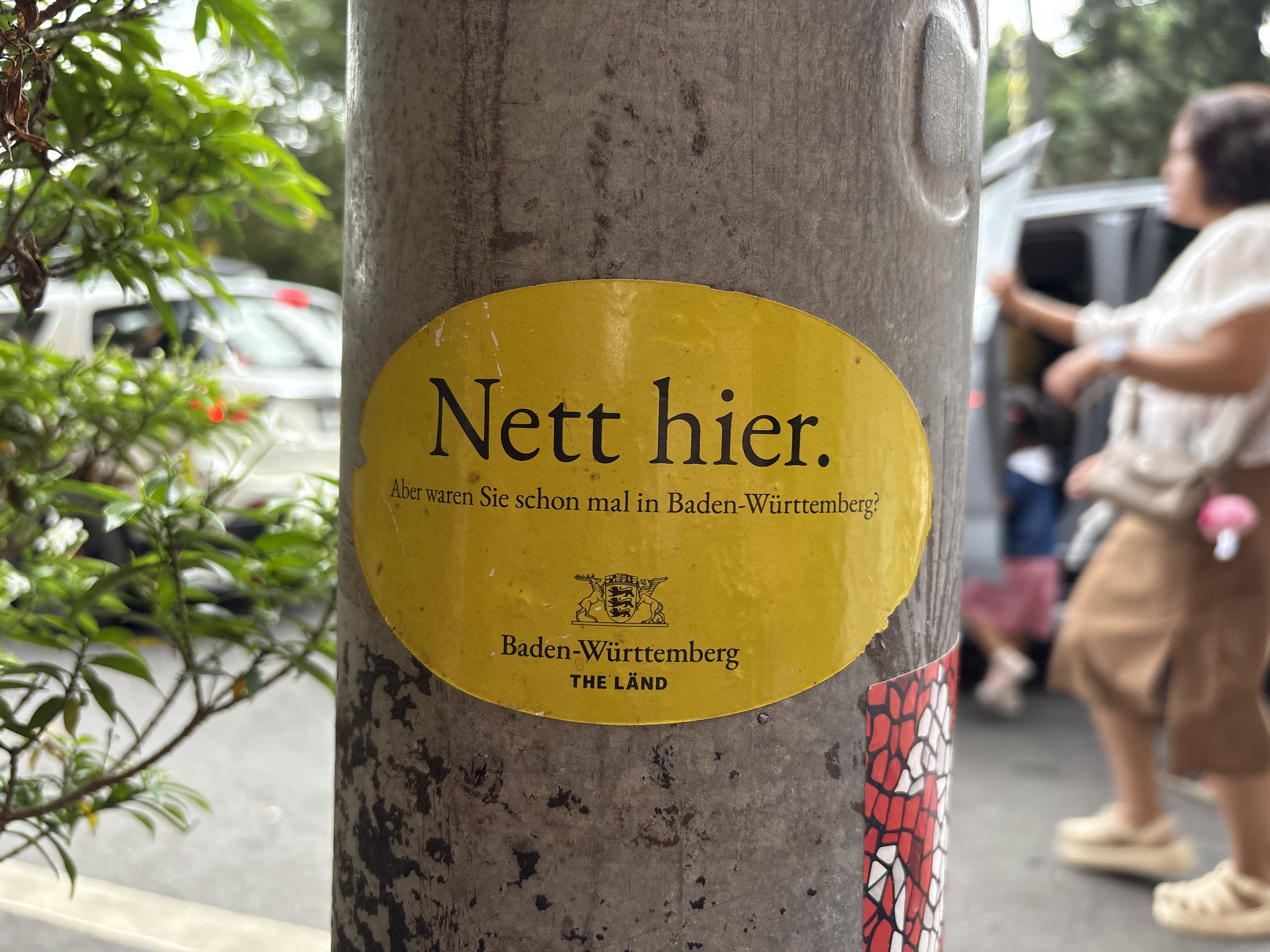
A Nett hier sticker near the entry of the Wat Phra That Doi Suthep Temple in Chiang Mai, Thailand

In 1999, as part of a marketing campaign for the German state of Baden-Württemberg, the company released the slogan "Nett hier. Aber waren Sie schon mal in Baden-Württemberg?" (English: Not bad. But have you ever been to Baden-Württemberg? (Note: "Not bad" appears on the official English language version of the stickers; the german "Nett hier" literally translates to "Nice here".)). In later years, the slogan was re-printed on stickers which have been found globally.

== Other works ==
Logo as of 2009
- Paralympic symbol (2003)
- Walk of Ideas (2006)
