= Dedalo Minosse Prize =

Italian architectural prize

Coordinates: 45°33′0.3″N 11°32′57.6″E

The Dedalo Minosse International Prize for commissioning a building is promoted by ALA-Assoarchitetti, Italian association for professional architects. The prize was created in 1997 to emphasize the client's role as a fundamental partner of both the architect and the builder in generating high-quality work.

The name Dedalo Minosse derives from Daedalus and Minos. Daedalus is considered the first architect of Greek mythology, while Minos was the first client.

The Prize is awarded biennially by a jury that includes internationally renowned architects, writers, art historians, journalists, industry executives, and planning officials. Additional prizes are awarded by ALA-Assoarchitetti and by Dedalo-Minosse patrons.

The presentation ceremony takes place in Teatro Olimpico in Vicenza, northern Italy, the city of architect Andrea Palladio.

Eligibility is open to architects, engineers and clients from around the world, with separate recognition for established architects and those under 40 years of age.

== See also ==
- List of architecture prizes
