= Parliamentary Counsel Office =

Parliamentary Counsel Office may refer to:

- The Office of Parliamentary Counsel (Australia)
- The Office of the Parliamentary Counsel (United Kingdom), the British Government office responsible for drafting government Bills
- The Office of the Parliamentary Counsel, an office within the office of the Attorney General of Ireland
- The Parliamentary Counsel Office (New Zealand), the equivalent state sector organisation of the Government of New Zealand
- The Parliamentary Counsel Office (Scotland), the equivalent directorate of the Scottish Government

In other jurisdictions, the term legislative counsel or similar may refer to:

- The Cabinet Legislation Bureau for the Cabinet of Japan
- The Office for the Welsh Legislative Counsel for the devolved National Assembly for Wales
- The Office of the Legislative Counsel of the United States House of Representatives

- The California Legislative Counsel for the California state legislature
- The Oregon Legislative Counsel for the Oregon Legislative Assembly

== See also ==
- Parliamentary counsel
