= Spreebogenpark =

Green space in Mitte, Berlin

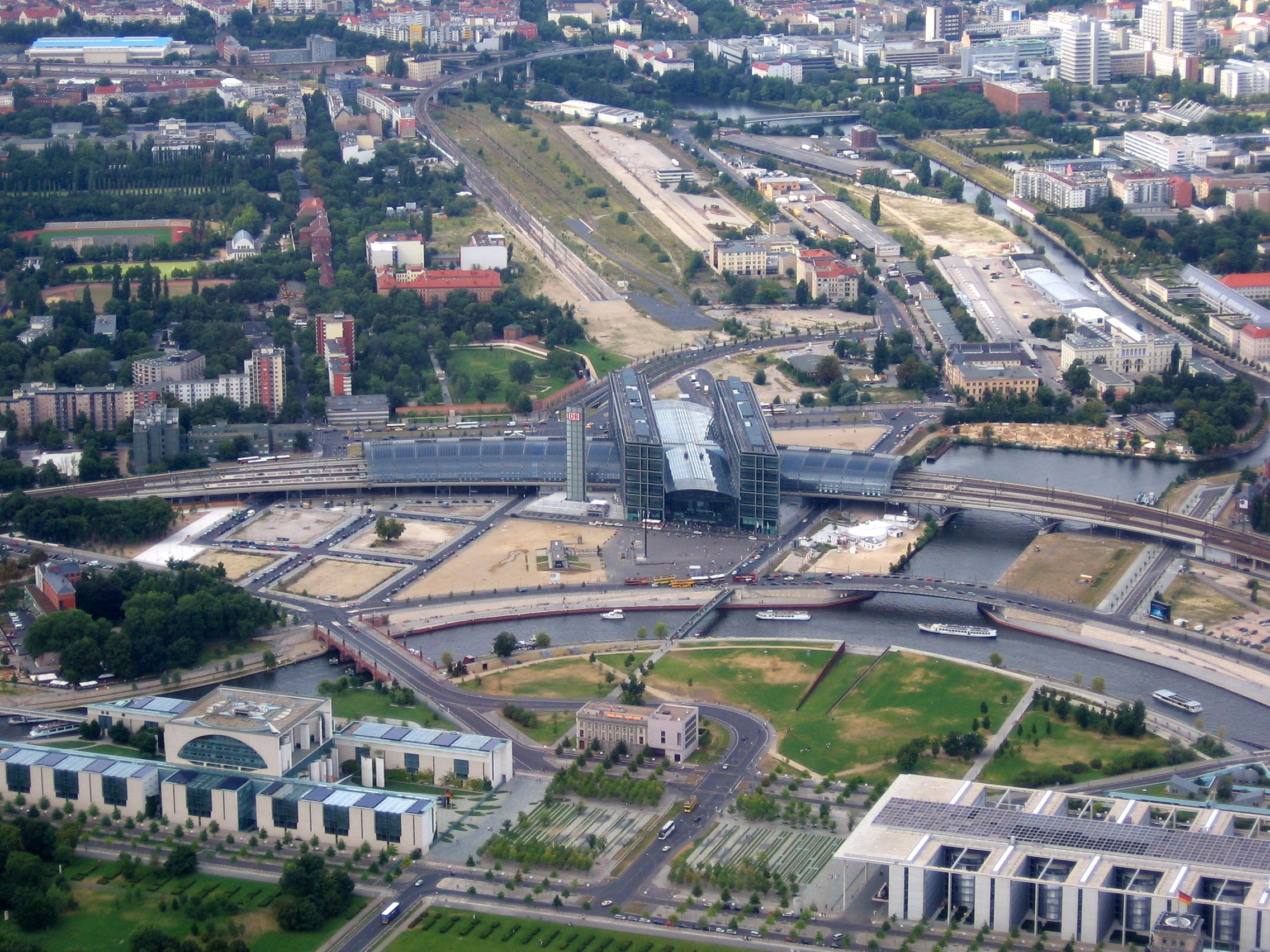
- The park across from Berlin Hauptbahnhof in 2008
- Interactive map of Spreebogenpark
- Coordinates: 52.5225°N 13.3722°E

Spreebogenpark is a park in the locality of Tiergarten in Berlin, Germany.
