= Riposte (disambiguation) =

A riposte is an offensive action in fencing.

Riposte may also refer to:

- Riposte (album), an album by Slovenly
- Riposte (magazine), a magazine based in the United Kingdom
- Riposte Alimentaire, a French environmentalist organization
- Ripostes, a collection of poems by Ezra Pound
