= Lina Eichler =

German climate activist

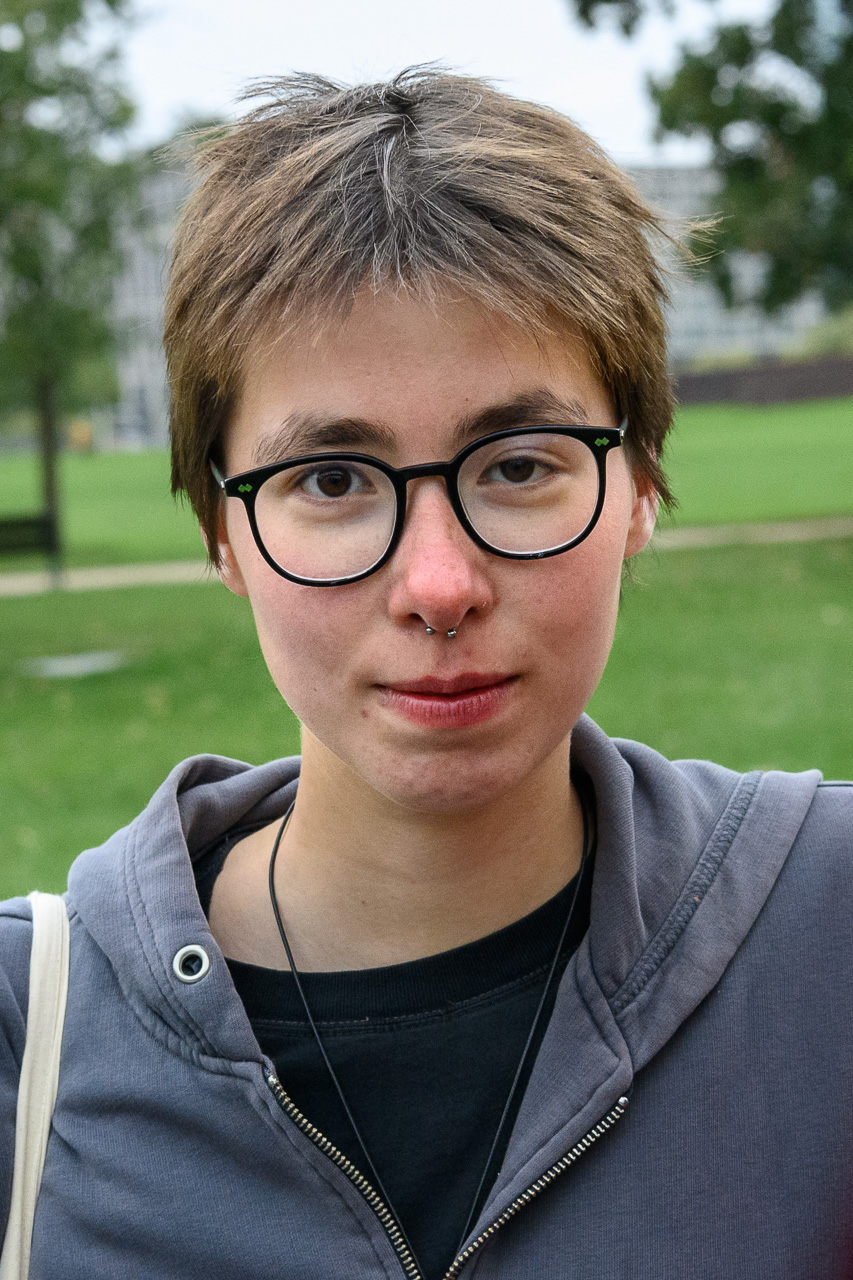
- Born: 2002 (age 23–24)
- Known for: Climate activist

Lina Eichler (born 2002) is a German climate activist and a prominent member of the Last Generation. She has been a hunger striker and involved with a wide variety of acts of disruption to bring attention to the climate change emergency.

== Life ==
Eichler was born in about 2002 and she is from North Rhine-Westphalia. At a time when she was scheduled to complete her high school graduation she decided to drop out and devote herself to activism. She came to notice as a member of "The Last Generation" who went on hunger strike (Hungerstreik der letzten Generation ) to attract attention to the group's concerns about climate change. They demanded meetings with key candidates for the German Chancellorship, and a citizen's assembly to find ways to limit climate change to 1.5 degrees. The group considered the strike to be the last possible peaceful protest. Eichler abandoned the strike after she collapsed after nearly three weeks and she was hospitalised in 2021. The group did get the promise of a meeting with Olaf Scholz which led Henning Jeschke to end the hunger strike.

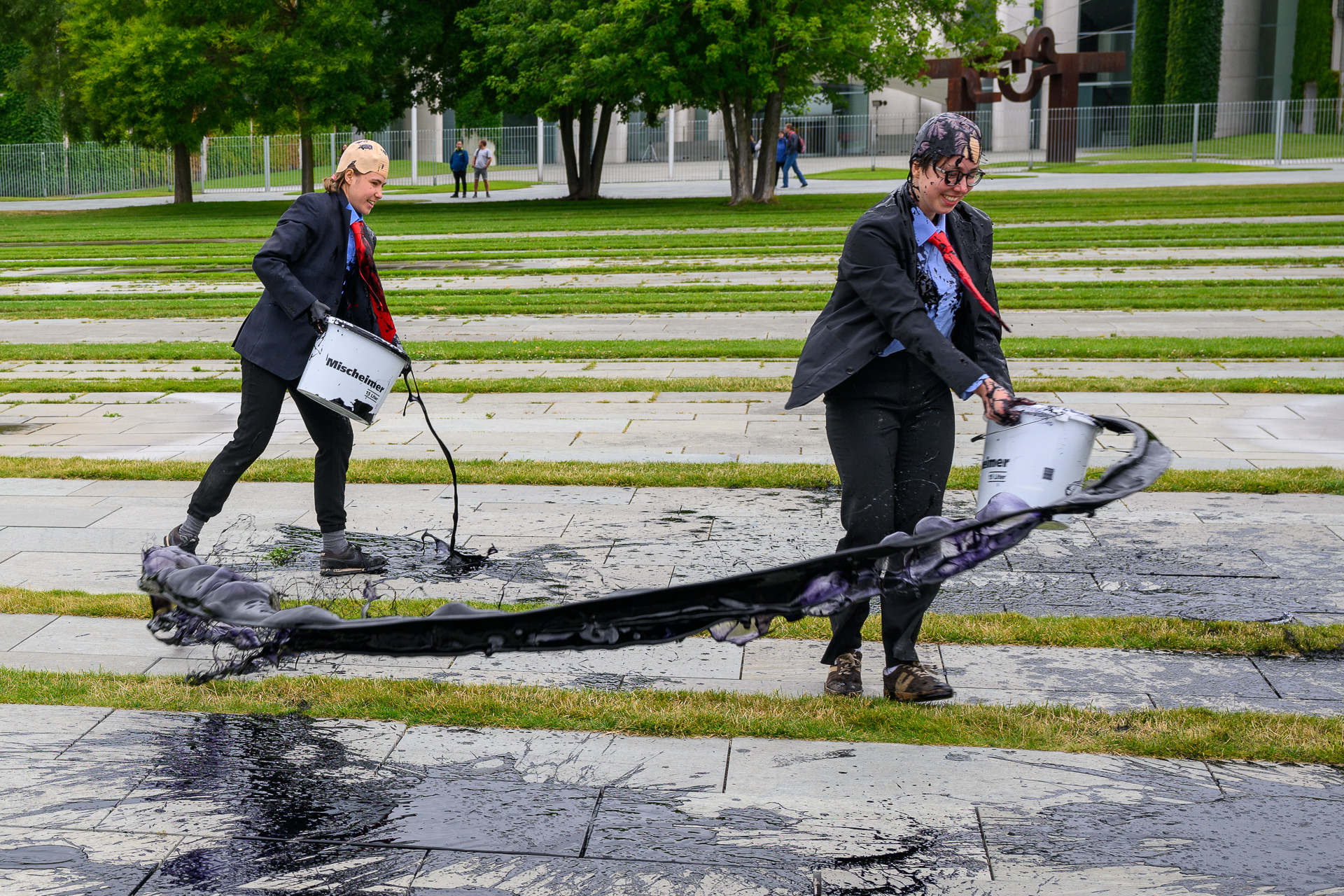
Activists from the last generation uprising in Chancellor Olaf Scholz costumes spill oil in front of the Federal Chancellery

In 2022 she was among other members of the group gluing themselves to roads to cause disruption. She and other activists dressed themselves up in Chancellor Olaf Scholz costumes, in July 2022, to spill oil in front of the Federal Chancellery. She was arrested for gluing herself to the frame of a painting from the Renaissance and she faces many fines and arrests. She knows that the public do not always support her actions, but she believes that the group are "the fire alarm" and that people may not enjoy fire alarms.

The Last Generation group obtained funding from a group in California to continue to protest against the burning of oil, gas and coal. Eichler and Henning Jeschke were interviewed to celebrate the group's first birthday in September 2022.

On 27 June 2023, a local court in Berlin found Eichler guilty of harmful damage to property, coercion, attempted coercion, and resistance to law enforcement officers in a total of seven cases. The guilty verdicts were in relation to Eichler having glued herself to a painting, and for her participation in five road blockades. The judge imposed a fine of 1,300 euros in daily instalments of 10 euros, saying that this was a "measured fine"; the public prosecutor had demanded a fine of 3,000 euros. The damage to the frame of the painting had already been paid, the judge noted.
