= Starving for honesty climate hunger strike, Berlin, Germany =

Climate protest in Berlin, Germany

Starving for honesty
- Hungern bis ihr ehrlich seid
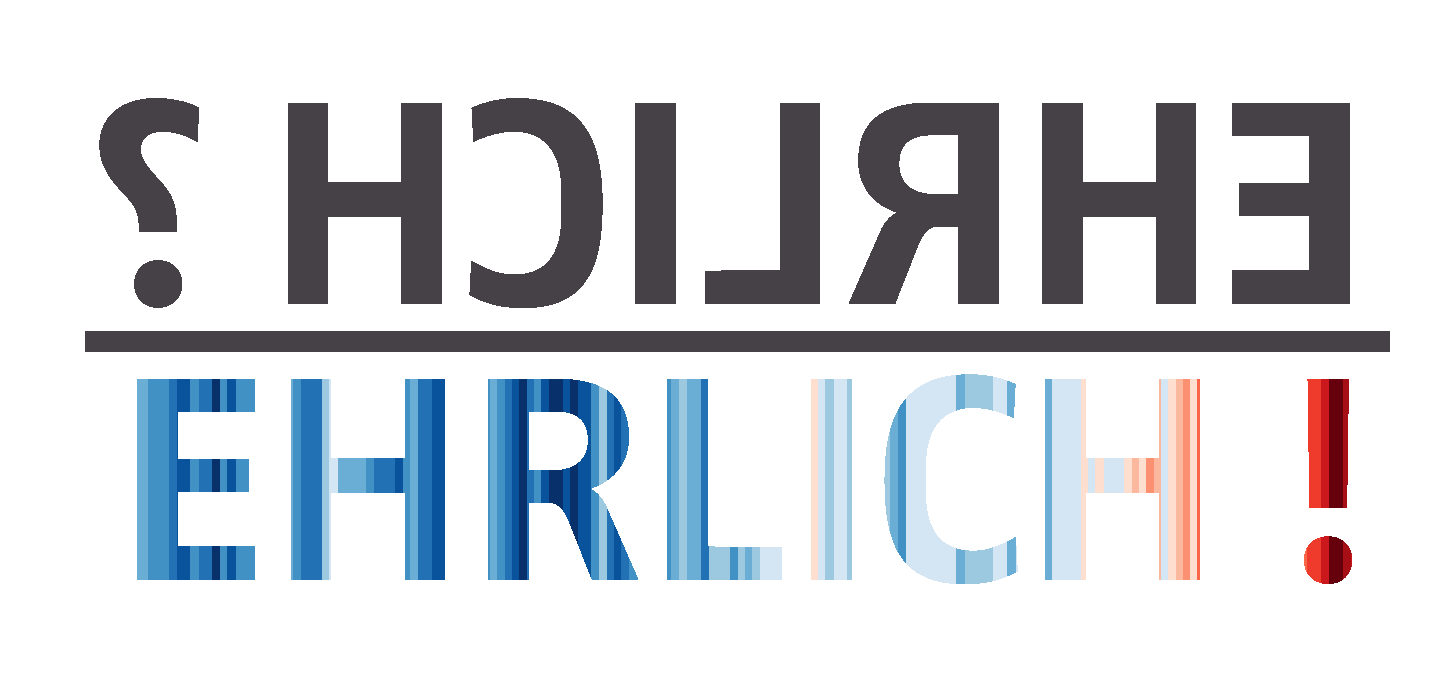
- Date: 2024
- Location: Berlin, Germany +52.5290°N +13.3759°E
- Goals: Climate protection
- Methods: Hunger strike protest and camp
- Status: Action ended on 13 June 2024

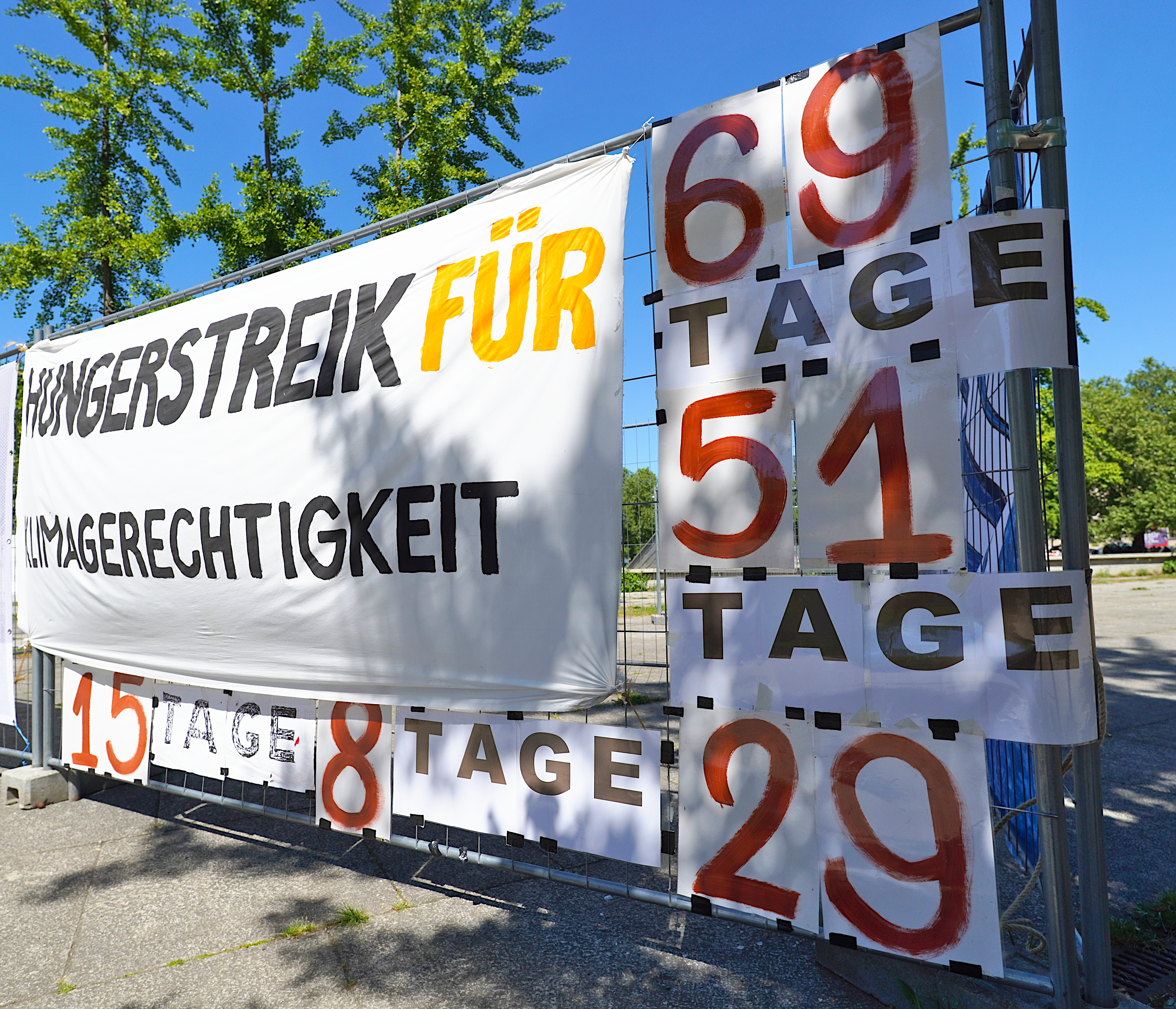
Count board recording strike durations for the then five hunger strikers, 14 May 2024

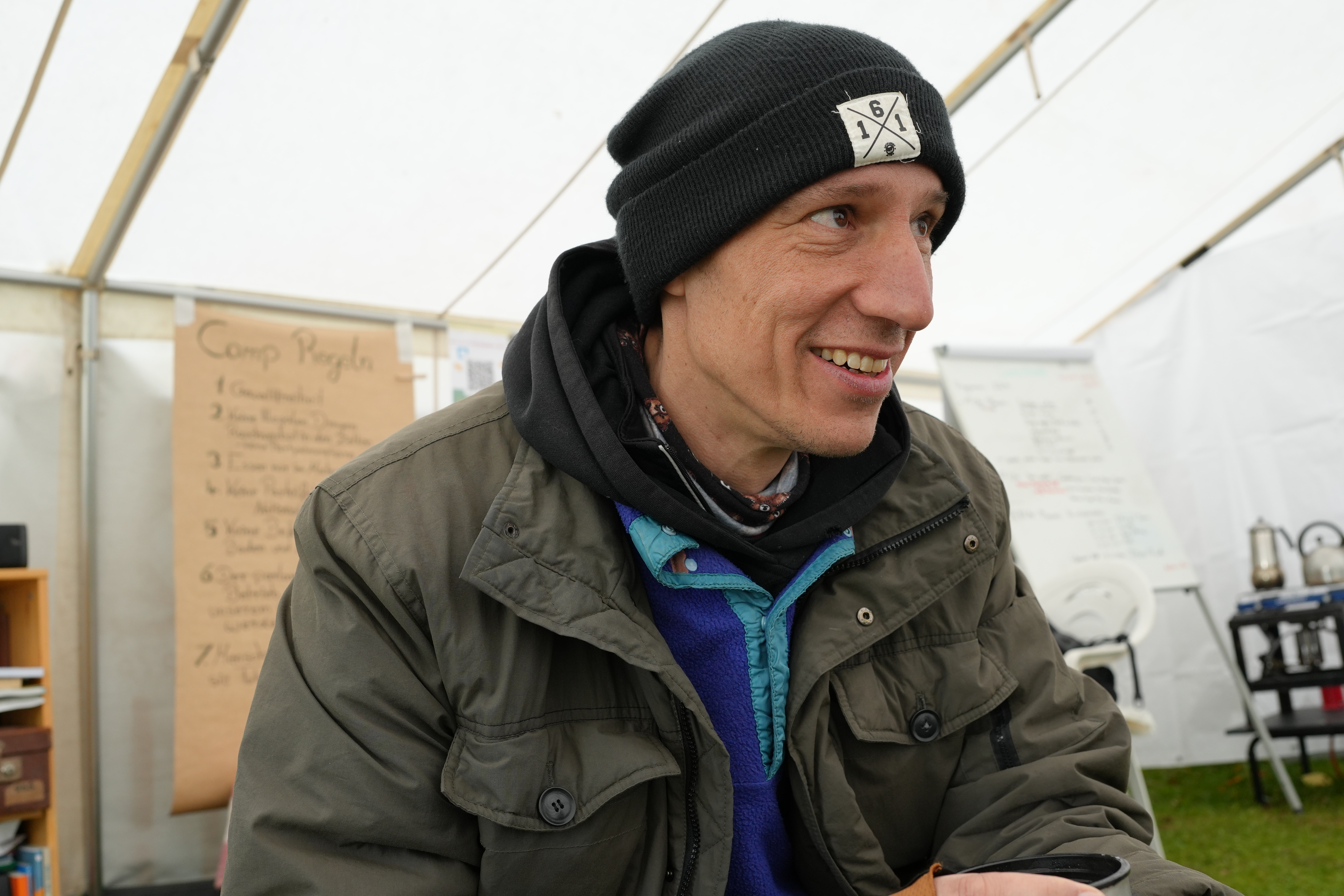
Metzeler-Kick during the 48th day of his hunger strike

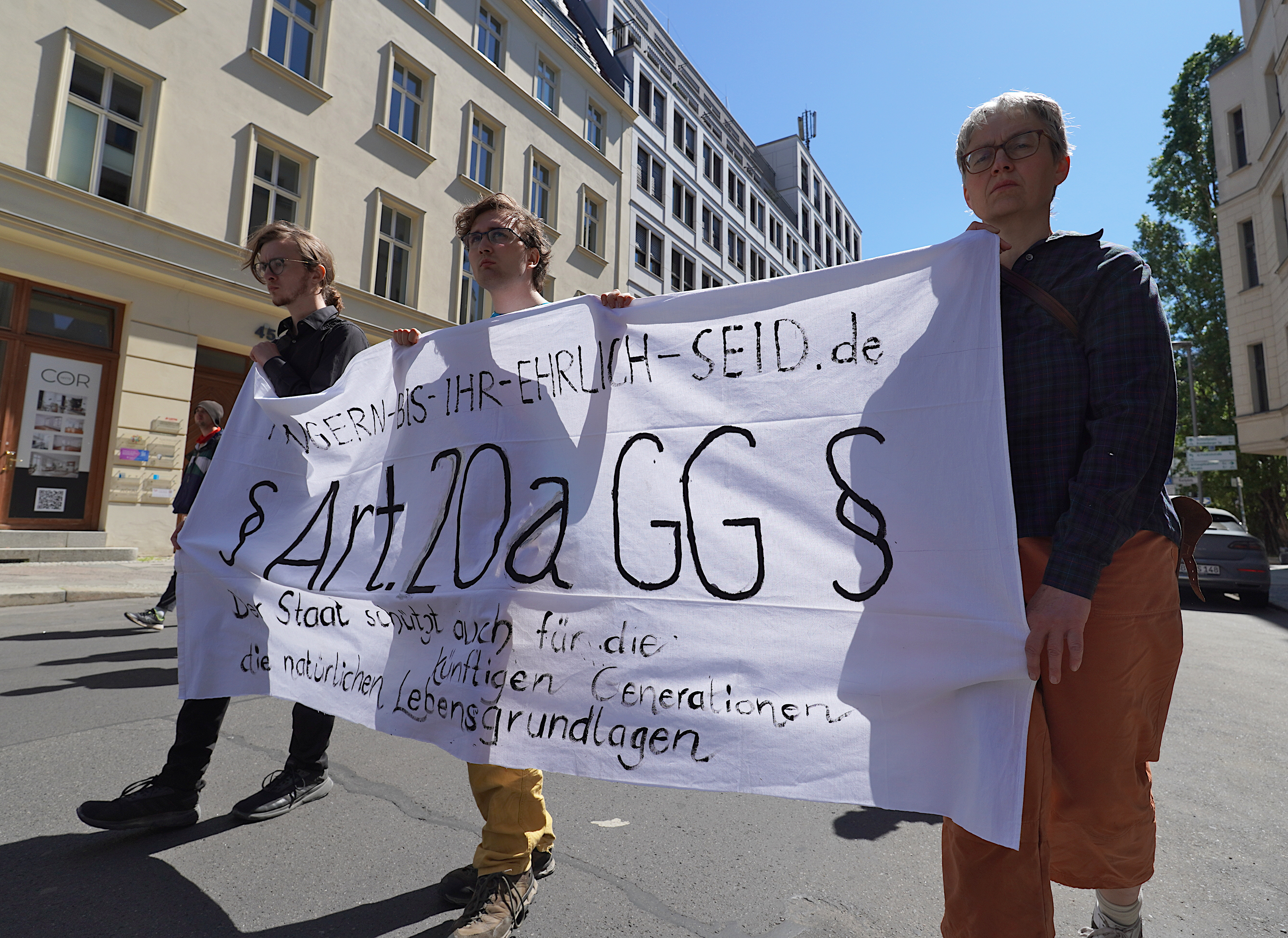
Supporters of the hunger strike hold a banner proclaiming Article 20a from the German Constitution. That passage begins that "the State, mindful also of its responsibility towards future generations, shall protect the natural foundations of life and animals".

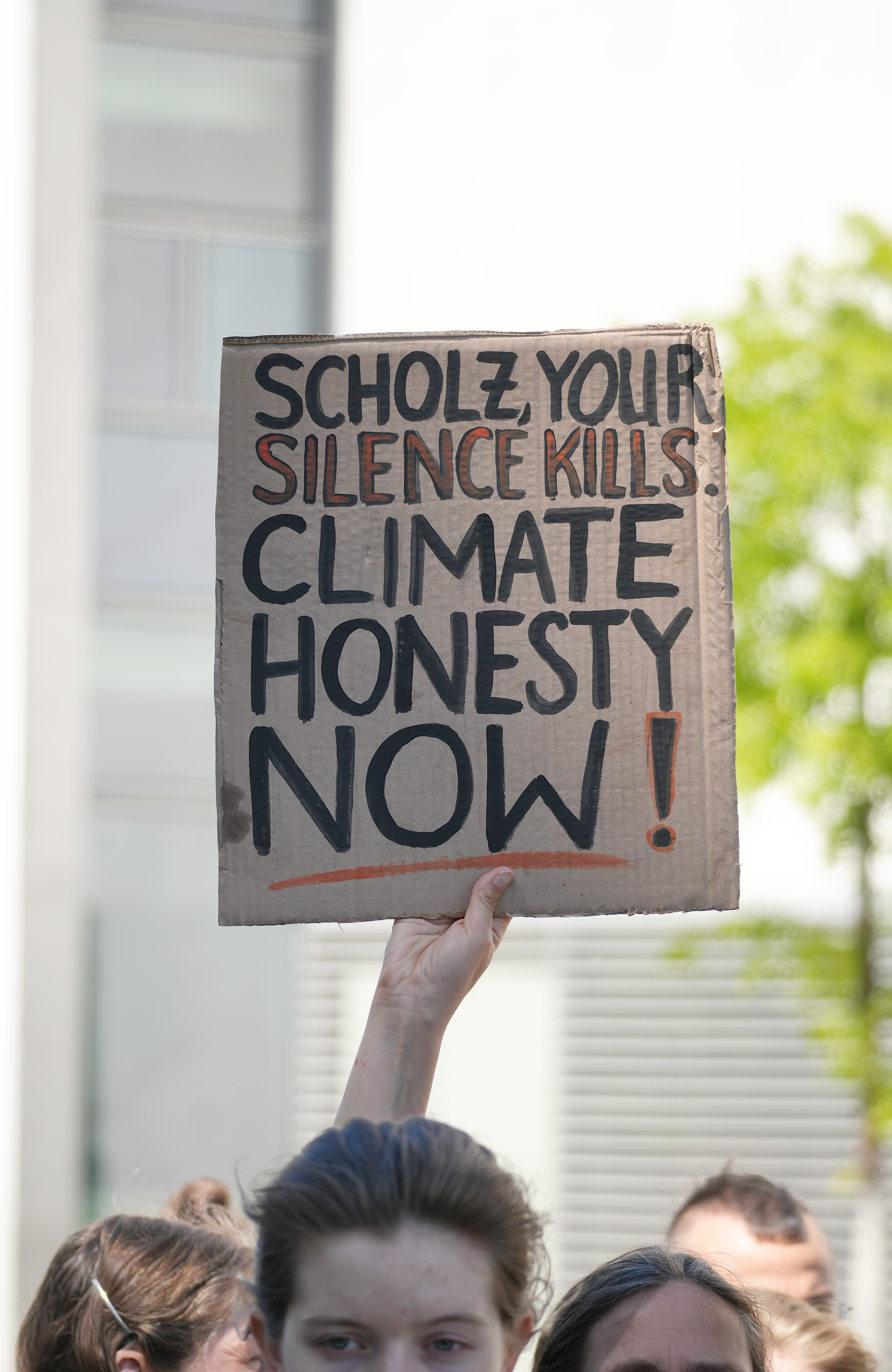
Placard by hunger strike supporter addressing German Chancellor Olaf Scholz

Starving for honesty (original German: Hungern bis ihr ehrlich seid and abbreviated: HE!) was a hunger strike and protest camp in Berlin, Germany in mid‑2024 that also served as a meeting point for climate activists. (Note: "Hungern bis ihr ehrlich seid" translates directly to "Starve until you are honest".) The hunger strikers called on German Federal Chancellor Olaf Scholz to recognize the severity of scientific consensus on climate change by issuing an official policy statement or Regierungserklärung that reacts accordingly.

The hunger strike began on 7 March 2024, with strikers joining one after the other, until a total of eight people had joined the strike. The original protest camp was erected on 25 March in Spreebogenpark, Berlin — in view of the German chancellor's residence or Bundeskanzleramt. On 29 April, the camp was required to move to Invalidenpark, Berlin.

The two longest strikers, Wolfgang Metzeler-Kick and Richard Cluse, went without solid food for 92 and 77 days respectively. On 27 May, the medical team of Metzeler-Kick described his medical condition as life‑threatening and withdrew support on legal grounds. Metzeler-Kick was hospitalized on 3 June but returned to the camp the same day after his condition had stabilized. On 6 June, he announced he would suspend his hunger strike. All remaining hunger strikers ended their action on 13 June.

== Background ==
On 26 February 2024, activists blocked an intersection in Siemensstadt, Berlin in front of the Heizkraftwerk Reuter West coal‑fired CHP power station. On 7 March, representatives of the alliance handed over a letter with their demands to Olaf Scholz at the Federal Chancellery in Berlin. That handover was accompanied by a symbolic protest in which Wolfgang (Wolli) Metzeler‑Kick, an engineer and activist who had previously drawn attention as a member of the Last Generation group, stood on a block of ice with a noose around his neck in front of the Federal Chancellery. This action was intended to illustrate the urgency of the climate crisis. On that same day, Metzeler-Kick became the first activist to commence an indefinite hunger strike.

The strikers reportedly limited themselves to a maximum of 500 ml of fruit or vegetable juice per day, plus vitamin supplements and electrolyte powder. Metzeler‑Kick refused juice in the latter part of his strike and as a result his blood sugar levels became critically low.

== Demands ==
The strikers and their supporters were calling for a government policy statement that explicitly recognizes the current scientific consensus on climate change. The alliance stated:

- that the climate crisis poses an existential threat to human civilization.
- that the CO_{2} content in the atmosphere, now at 420 ppm, is too high;
- that the 2021 SSP1‑1.9 pathway, which targets 350 ppm by 2150, offers the best chance; and
- that rapid radical action is needed to change course.

The last three points are backed by references to the scientific literature and reports from the Intergovernmental Panel on Climate Change (IPCC).

The alliance was not pursuing other goals besides the ones above. According to the alliance, the hunger strike was to end the moment the Federal Government issued a declaration in line with these aspirations. In press release from 3 June 2024, the group said that it would simplify its demands, including dropping its demand regarding recognition by Chancellor Scholz of particular CO_{2} values, instead asking for an acknowledgement that there was no remaining carbon budget.

== Evolution of the protest ==
On 24 March 2024, activists from the campaign alliance held a vigil in front of the Federal Constitutional Court in Karlsruhe. They referred to the judgement of the Federal Constitutional Court made three years earlier to that day that declared certain provisions of the Federal Climate Change Act unconstitutional, and that required the emission reduction monitoring after 2030 to be revised.

The alliance ran a protest camp in Berlin, registered as a long-term rally with authorities, from 25 March 2024. In the first five weeks, it was located in Spreebogenpark in the government district, near the Bundeskanzleramt. The camp was then moved to Invalidenpark on 29 April. The reason for this relocation was the expiry of the previous notice of assembly and the fact that a "fan mile" was planned in that vicinity as part of the celebrations for the 2024 European Football Championship. The climate activists demonstrated against this relocation with so‑called "slow walks" through the government district with some protesters wearing skeleton costumes.

The protest action began with 49‑year-old environmental engineer Wolfgang Metzeler‑Kick commencing his hunger strike on 7 March 2024. On 25 March, 57‑year-old engineer Richard Cluse joined the strike. On 30 April, a 35‑year-old known only as Tin began. They were treated in hospital on 15 May after losing consciousness but later discharged themselves to continue with their strike. On 16 May, 41‑year-old Titus Feldmann joined the hunger strike. On 18 May, 61‑year-old Michael Winter ended his strike after 31 days. Winter had earlier been treated in the emergency department at Schwabing Hospital, Munich with medical complications, following his admission to the clinic on 15 May. On 21 May, Tin abandoned their hunger strike.

Metzeler-Kick was hospitalized on 3 June. In the morning of that day, he had announced his intention to go into a dry hunger strike. He returned to the protest camp later that day after his condition had stabilized. On 6 June he stated that he intended to suspend his hunger strike.

The medical team in Berlin overseeing the hunger strike of Winter had earlier withdrawn support due to his deteriorating health status and his personal desire to continue. The doctors treating Winter must act in accordance with German medical law. The wishes of the subject and his treatment imperatives are counter, such that the medical team can no longer provide care and fulfill their legal and ethical obligations. At that point, Winter had been without food for approximately 27 days.

The medical team overseeing the hunger strike of Metzeler‑Kick withdrew their professional support on 27 May 2024. Susanne Koch, a member of the medical team at the site, said in a video statement that collapse could happen at any time. At that point, Metzeler‑Kick had been without food for approximately 81 days.

On 13 June 2024, the alliance announced that its hunger strike had ended, acknowledging that the action had not reached its objective. Scholz, it said in the same statement, preferred to talk about "fighting the symptoms" of the climate crisis. It also criticized the media for scant reporting and for "mostly" rendering its demands wrongly, and called for acts of sabotage by activists.

== Reactions ==
=== Official reactions ===
Deputy government spokesperson Christiane Hoffmann said on 3 April 2024 that Federal Chancellor Olaf Scholz was concerned that people had gone on hunger strike. Government spokesperson Steffen Hebestreit stated at a press conference on 8 April that the government would not respond to the individual demands of the campaign alliance; the chancellery said in early May that this position had not changed. On 24 May, Scholz publicly called on the activists to end their hunger strikes, and repeated this call on 26 and 30 May.

=== Other political reactions ===
On 15 May 2024, Carola Rackete, the leading Die Linke candidate for the 2024 European elections, expressed support for the hunger strikers but remained skeptical that Chancellor Scholz would react to their demands.

Maiken Winter, district councillor for the Ecological Democratic Party in Weilheim-Schongau, participated in a vigil in front of the Landratsamt Weilheim to draw attention to the demands of the hunger strikers, who included her brother as the third activist to go on indefinite hunger strike on 16 April 2024.

=== Reactions from scientists ===
Notable scientists who have publicly supported the demands of the hunger strikers include climate researcher Hans Joachim Schellnhuber, geophysicist Bernhard Steinberger, and physicist Eicke Weber.

Scientists active in Scientist Rebellion also supported the demands of hunger strikers. Over 30 people joined the symbolic protest of solidarity fasting, and abstained from food for two days at a time.

On 6 May 2024, Scientists for Future Germany published a statement on the demands of the hunger strikers. and noted that the demands for a government declaration on climate protection are "scientifically sound and reasonable". But more than 100 signatories declared that, while they share and support the campaign's concerns, they judge a hunger strike to be an "inappropriate form of protest".

On 15 May 2024, energy expert Claudia Kemfert said that: "I understand and support the concerns of the hunger strikers" but that she did not believe that hunger strikes were the appropriate form of protest: "We don't need martyrs, we need arguments, perseverance, and persuasion to win over democratic majorities in favor of a resolute and effective climate policy".

In an interview published by taz on 2 June 2024, sociologist Dieter Rucht said that it would be difficult to assess the advantages and disadvantages of chancellor Scholz acceding to the hunger strikers' demands: doing so would possibly make him appear empathic, but might also lead to other groups trying to achieve their own aims by similar means. Rucht further said that the claim by hunger striker Metzeler-Kick that other avenues for climate activists to voice their demands had already been exhausted was "arguable", and pointed to what he considered the small likelihood of altering the course of climate politics through such an action. He voiced his respect for the sincerity of the hunger strikers, but said he would advise against this hunger strike due to the "modest effect" that could be achieved through the "drastic action" and in view of the possible consequences for the activists.

=== Media commentary ===
A commentary from 7 June 2024 in the Frankfurter Allgemeine Zeitung assessed that the refusal by Scholz to accede to the demands had contributed to dashing the hopes of the protest camp that the hunger strike action would succeed.

=== Reactions by civil society ===
In March 2024, 18 local groups of Parents for Future sent an open letter to German Federal President Frank-Walter Steinmeier in which they took up the demands of the hunger strikers for a government policy statement and called on the Federal President to bring this to the attention of the Federal Chancellor.

Psychologists/Psychotherapists for Future released a statement in April 2024 that it shared the demands of the climate strikers, but distanced itself from hunger striking as a form of protest. The co‑initiator of the association, Lea Dohm, made the same statement at a campaign alliance press conference on 7 May.

In early May 2024, the Last Generation Austria supported the hunger strikers with a vigil in front of the German Embassy in Vienna, and a demonstration in front of the Austrian Parliament. On 28 May 2024, Fridays for Future Germany distanced themselves from the hunger strike action.

== See also ==
- Gregory Andrews § Climate Hunger Strike – single‑person hunger strike in 2023 in Canberra, Australia
- Hungerstreik der letzten Generation – hunger strike in 2021 that marked the start of the Last Generation movement
