= Collectif Antigone =

- Headquarters: Quebec
- Key people: Jacob Pirro; Olivier Huard
- Affiliations: Last Generation Canada; Extinction Rebellion

Collectif Antigone is a collective of environmental and social justice activists based in Canada. Their actions have mostly taken place in Quebec, and usually involve civil disobedience, including climbing structures to generate attention for environmental causes. They identify as a feminist and decentralized organization in which responsibility is shared among its members.

They have partnered with other organizations including Last Generation Canada and Extinction Rebellion.

Their name is inspired by Antigone, whom the group sees as a figure of civil disobedience, revolt, and feminism. The group was also inspired by Sophie Deraspe’s film Antigone.

== Organization and aims ==
The group operates primarily in Quebec, Canada, with other actions taking place in Vancouver and elsewhere. They often operate in collaboration with other activist groups as such Last Generation and Extinction Rebellion.

The organization focuses on establishing climate justice today to enhance the quality of life for future generations. Core demands from the group include; the elimination of air pollution, corporate greenwashing and fossil fuel exploitation and consumption.

Known members include Jacob Pirro and Olivier Huard. Pirro and Huard were involved in the 2024 Jacques Cartier Bridge protest of the international Fossil Fuel Non-Proliferation Treaty, for which they were later tried in a Quebec court.

== Activism ==
Jacques Cartier Bridge

On the morning of October 22, 2024, the collective climbed the Jacques Cartier Bridge. Olivier Huard, Jacob Pirro, and other collective members protested climate change by shutting down the bridge. Their demands of the Canadian government were to endorse the Fossil Fuel Non-Proliferation Treaty to prohibit new oil, coal, and gas developments; put in place a national authority to mitigate climate disasters; and close the 47-year-old Enbridge Line 9B pipeline which transports Albertan oil through Quebec and Ontario, allegedly threatening the clean water of more than three million people.

Valero Oil Terminal protest

On October 19, 2022, 12 collective members were arrested after having chained themselves to the Valero Energy petroleum terminals and a train container for 24 hours to protest the Enbridge 9B pipeline passing from Ottawa to Montreal.

== Legal history ==
The members of the Collectif involved in the 24-hour occupation of the Valero oil terminal of 2022 pleaded not guilty using a Defence of Necessity in court, after trying several other legal alternatives; peaceful protests, participation in movements, conference presentations, writing and publication of letters and articles, and pursuing candidacy for elections. The members argued they acted out of necessity to save lives and believed they had no other choice but to break the law to have an effect.

This legal excuse, as opposed to a justification defense strategy, was the first of its kind in the context of environmental activism.

As of 2021, the Supreme Court of Canada considers climate change as an existential threat to humanity [2021 SCC 11; threshold questions: line 167]. There are now questions about if and how the defence of necessity can be applied to climate change and environmental activism in future legal cases.

== See also ==
- Last Generation
- Extinction Rebellion
