= Shaking up Parliament – Voice of the Last Generation =

Shaking Up Parliament – Voice of the Last Generation Parlament aufmischen – Stimme der Letzten Generation
- Abbreviation: LETZTE
- Chairperson: Henning Jeschke
- Founded: 29 March 2024; 22 months ago
- Membership (2024): 41
- Ideology: Environmentalism; Social justice
- Political position: Left-wing
- National affiliation: Letzte Generation
- Colors: Orange

Website
- parlament-aufmischen.de

The Shaking Up Parliament - Voice of the Last Generation (German: Parlament aufmischen – Stimme der Letzten Generation) is a minor electoral group in Germany that participated in the 2024 European parliament elections. It acts as the parliamentarian arm of the Last Generation movement, which is considered left-wing and supports environmentalist policies in general.

== History ==
On February 7, 2024, the Last Generation announced that it would participate in the European elections in June of the same year and began collecting donations and the necessary 4,000 signatures. On March 29, the Federal Electoral Committee approved the nomination.

In the European elections, the Last Generation received 0.26% of the vote and failed to win a single seat.

== Ideology and Platform ==
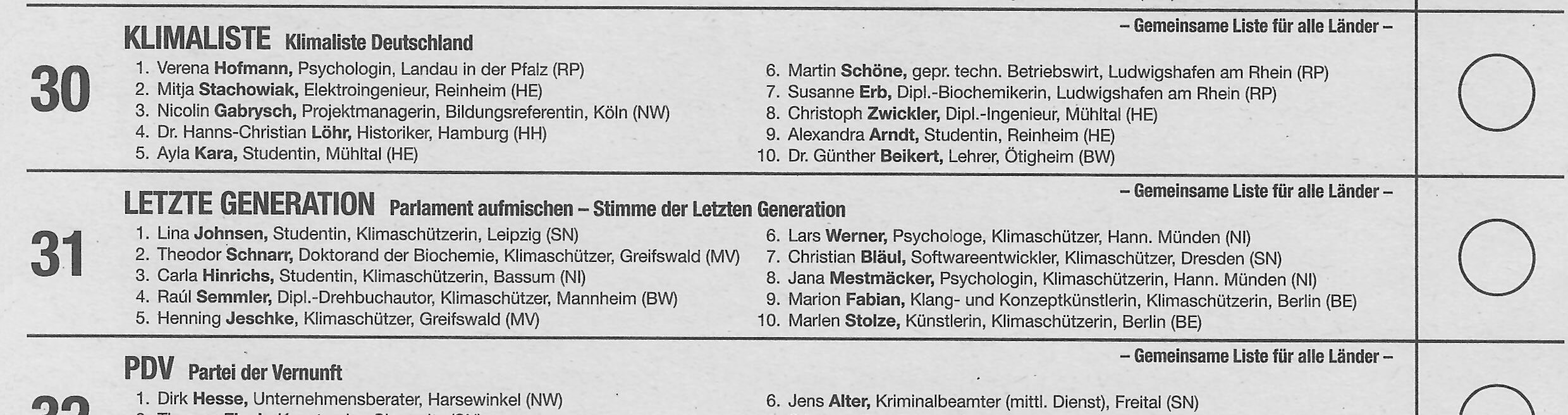
The Last Generation on the ballot

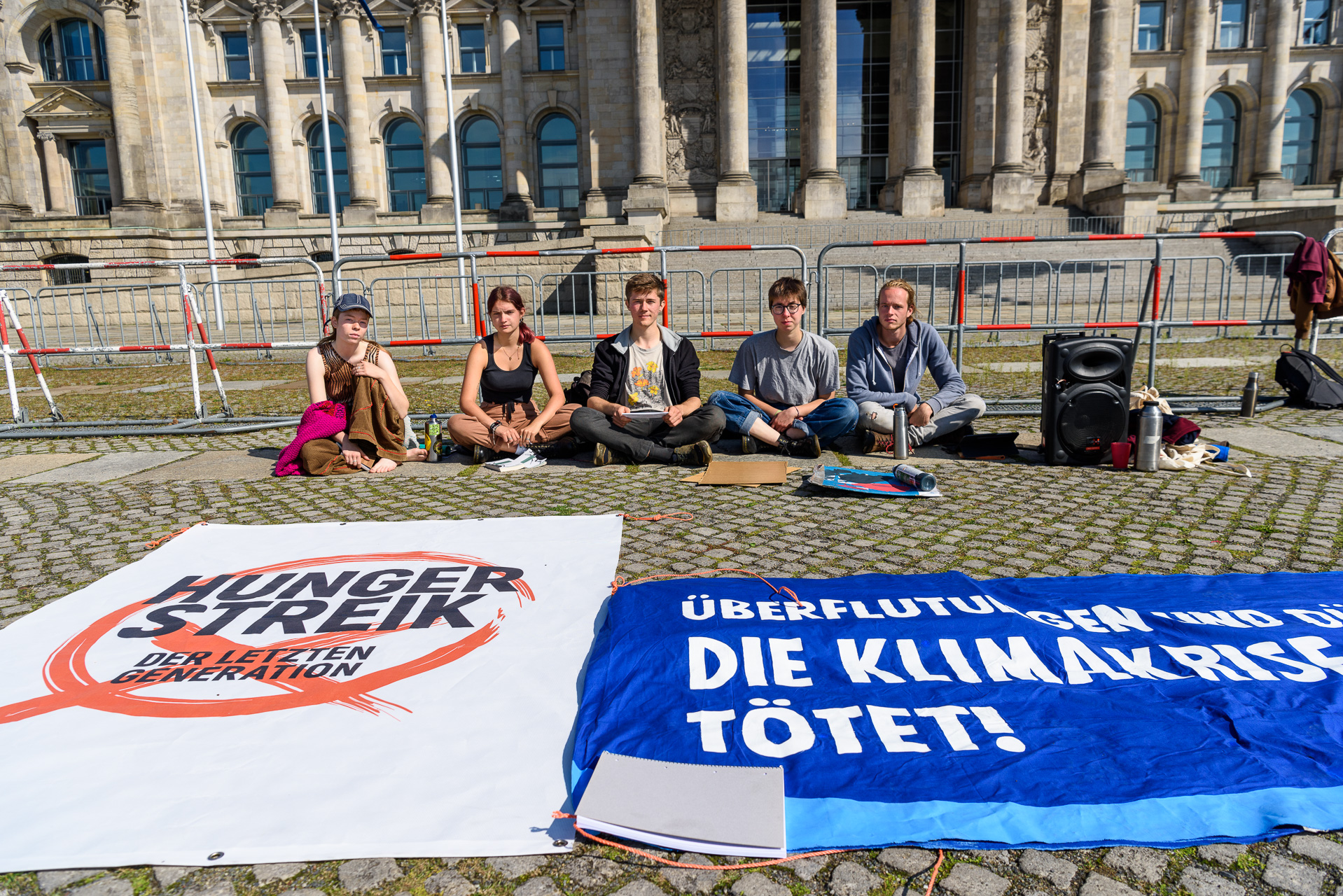
Members of the Last Generation hold a hunger strike outside the Reichstag building

The Last Generation demands that the EU phases out oil, gas and coal by 2030, funded by new taxes for the "rich and super-rich". The EU is also to make reparations to former European colonies. The party also calls for greater acceptance of asylum seekers, as well as further social justice.

== Election results ==
=== European Parliament ===
Election	List leader	Votes	%	Seats	+/–	EP Group
2024	Lina Johnsen	104,340	0.26 (#21)	0 / 96	New	–

== See also ==
- Last Generation (climate movement)
- Just Stop Oil
- Burning Pink
