= Grouping of electors =

Association without party status that nominates candidates in elections

Grouping of electors is a group of citizens temporarily associated with the goal of presenting a candidature to a particular election. It is a format that a candidature can use to participate in a given election not having a political party.

== Germany ==
In Germany, a voters' association or voter group is the most common form of electoral grouping on the municipal level. They are variously called Wählergruppe, Wählergemeinschaft, Wählervereinigung or Wählerinitiative. Common universal names for them include Unabhängige Wählergemeinschaft (UWG), Unabhängige Wähler-Vereinigung (UWV) or Freie Wählergemeinschaft (FWG). Multiple political parties in Germany, such as Alliance 90/The Greens or the Free Voters, trace their origins back to multiple localized voter groups.

For the elections to the European Parliament, non-political party participants are called sonstige politische Vereinigung (other political associations), abbreviated as SPV; an example of this includes the Last Generation which participated in the 2024 European Parliament election as Shaking up Parliament – Voice of the Last Generation.

== Italy ==
In Italy, local political groupings without party affiliation are known as civic lists (Lista civica).

== Spain ==
According to the Spanish electoral law, a (Spanish: agrupación de electores) a candidature must present a minimum number of signatures relative to the electoral census. Given its temporary nature, if the promoters wanted to use the grouping for another election, the latter must be re-constituted. Unlike political parties, party federations or electoral coalitions, a grouping of electors cannot profit from public electoral funding from a preceding candidature.

=== Signatures ===
- Municipal elections

As established in the Art. 192 of the electoral law, the required number of signatures depends on the size of the municipality:

  - Under 5,000 inhabitants, the number of signatures must be no less than the 1% of voters as long as the number of signataries is over the double of electable councillors.
  - Between 5,001 and 10,000 inhabitants, at least 100 signatures
  - Between 10,001 and 50,000 inhabitants, at least 500 signatures
  - Between 50,001 and 150,000 inhabitants, at least 1,500 signatures
  - Between 150,001 and 300,000 inhabitants, at least 3,000 signatures
  - Between 300,001 and 1,000,000 inhabitants, at least 5,000 signatures
  - In larger areas, at least 8,000 signatures
- General elections

For a group of electors to compete in a given general election, they must present a minimum number of signatures, amounting to 1% of the electors in the electoral district (which correspond to each province and Ceuta and Melilla).

- European elections

For a group of electors to compete in a given election to the European Parliament, they must present a minimum of 15,000 signatures.

== See also ==
- Civic list (Italy)
- Free Voters
- Local election
- Localism (politics)
- Regionalism (politics)
- Shaking up Parliament – Voice of the Last Generation
