= Riposte Alimentaire =

French civil resistance collective

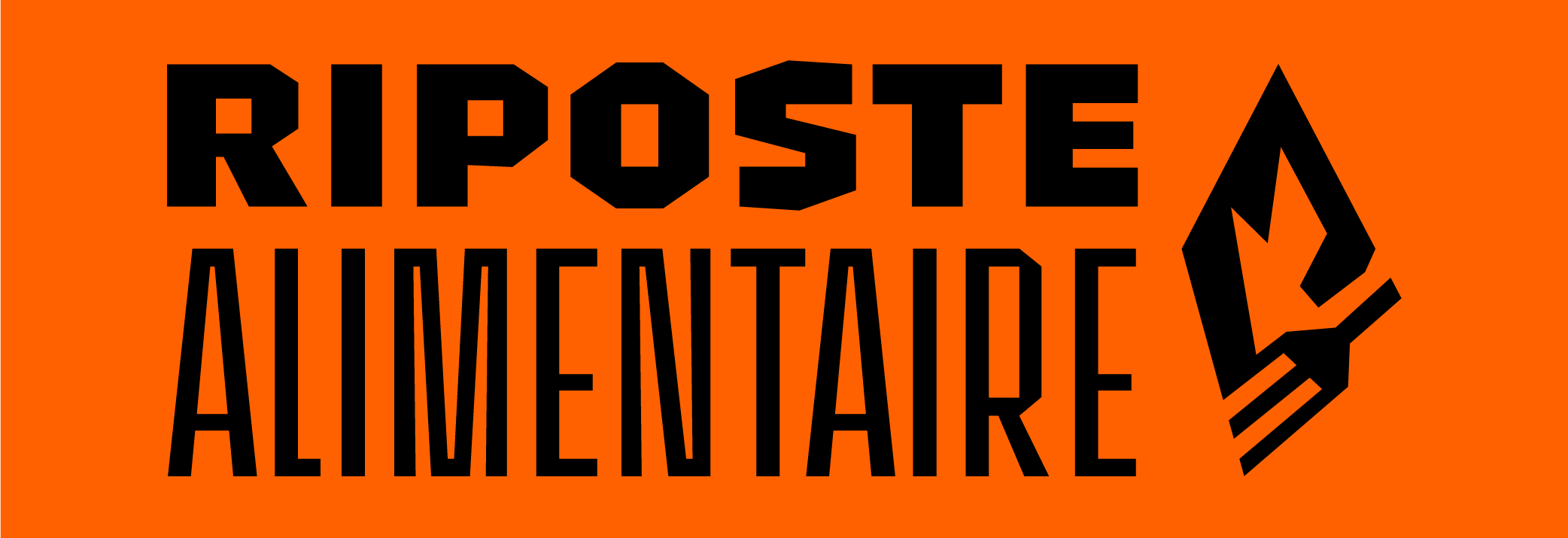
French ecologist campaign Riposte Alimentaire.

Riposte Alimentaire, formerly Dernière Rénovation, is a French civil resistance collective created in the spring of 2022.

It is part of an international network of eleven climate projects called A22, including Just Stop Oil (United Kingdom), Återställ Våtmarker (Sweden), Renovate Switzerland (Switzerland), Last Generation (Germany).

Having become known for its peaceful outbursts, it demanded a thermal renovation plan for buildings until December 2023, the date on which Dernière Rénovation announced the end of its campaign, considering that it had gone "to the end of what [they] could hope to gain".

On January 28, 2024, the collective launched a new campaign called Riposte Alimentaire, in order to obtain the establishment of a social security for sustainable food.

The collective announced that they would stop their activities on 17 October 2024.
