= Carla Hinrichs =

German political activist

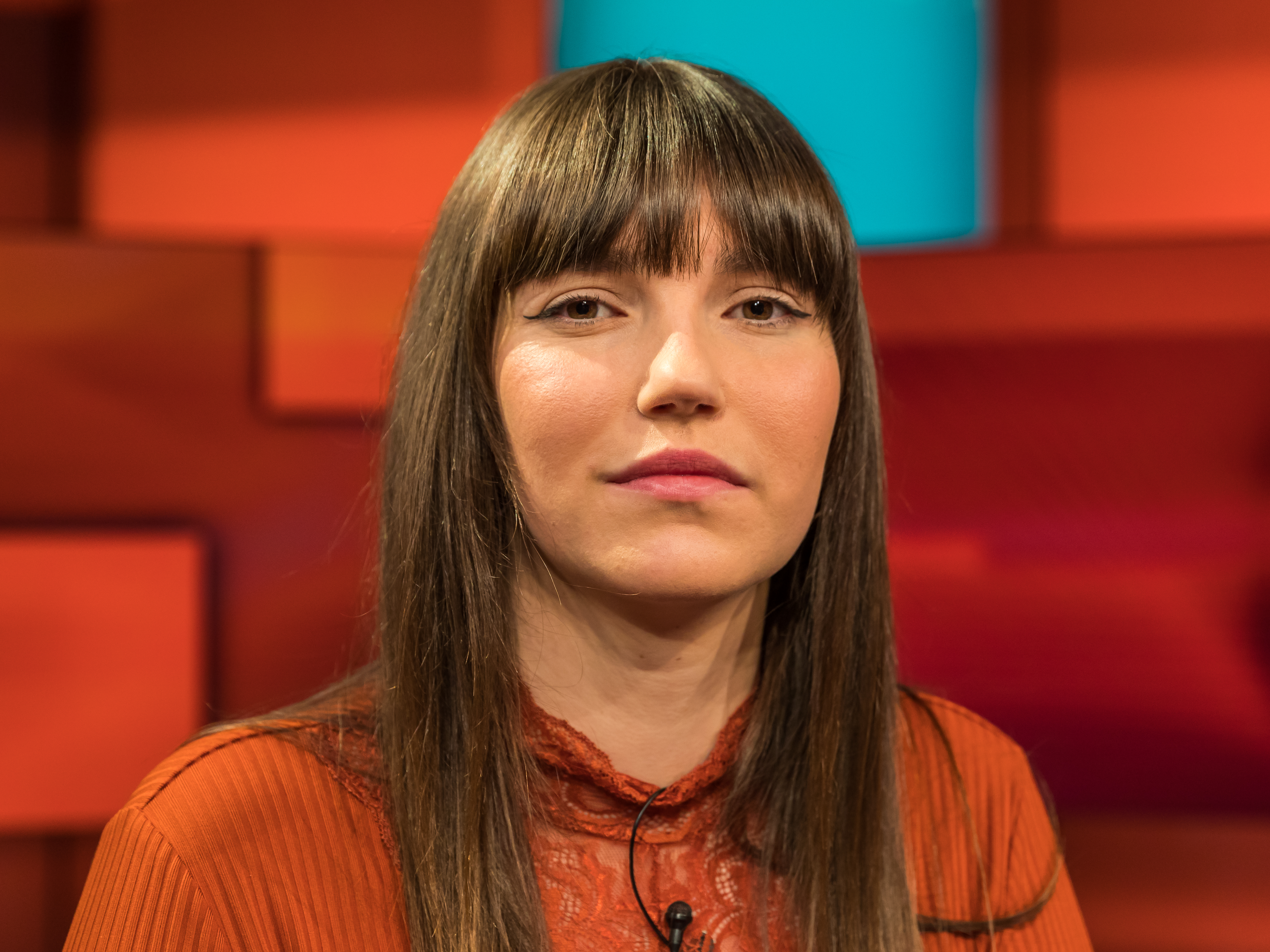
- Hinrichs in 2023
- Born: Carla Hinrichs; 7 February 1997 (age 29); Bremen, Germany
- Education: University of Bremen
- Occupations: Climate and political activist
- Movement: Last Generation (climate movement)

Carla Hinrichs is a German political activist and author. She served as a spokesperson for the German climate movement Last Generation and has faced criminal charges for "establishment of a criminal organization" (Gründung einer kriminellen Vereinigung) under German law.

Carla Hinrichs does not align herself with any political party.

== Live ==
Carla Hinrichs was born on 7. February 1997 in Bremen and grew up in a small city close by. During her school years, she was politically active and involved with Amnesty International. In 2015, she began studying law at the University of Bremen, pursuing her studies up to the first state examination.

Last Generation was formed in 2021 and in Germany, their protests have mainly focused on blocking roads and runways in an effort to affect transport policy. Last generation derived from the international climate movement Fridays for Future. From 2022, she became involved with the group Letzte Generation (Last Generation), representing the movement on talk shows and serving as an on-site spokesperson during protests from 2022 to 2025.

In the 2024 European election in Germany, Hinrichs ran in third position on the list for the electoral group "Parlament aufmischen – Stimme der Letzten Generation" (Shake Up Parliament – Voice of the Last Generation). The group did not secure a seat.

On May 24, 2023, the police led by Bavaria prosecutor launched a nationwide raid. 170 officers searched 15 properties across seven states. Police officers searched Hinrichs’ apartment after the Munich Public Prosecutor General's Office had initiated an investigation into her and six other members of the "Last Generation" (Letzte Generation) on suspicion of forming a criminal organization. The group's website was also temporarily taken offline. This course of action sparked sharp criticism as well as legal challenges. Hinrichs later described the search as the experience that most profoundly altered her relationship with the German state.

In April 2026, Hinrichs announced that she had been charged as a "ringleader" in connection with the allegation of forming a criminal organization, pursuant to Section 129 of the German Criminal Code (StGB). The "Central Office for Combating Extremism and Terrorism" within the Bavarian public prosecutor's office drafted a 149-page indictment against Hinrichs. As of November 2026, it remained undecided whether the court would initiate formal proceedings.

== Positions ==
=== Last Generation ===
Hinrichs argues that it is not the Last Generation project that has failed, but rather Germany as a whole, as a society that has failed to halt the climate crisis. While the Last Generation did not succeed in securing any of its demands or in shaking society awake enough to spark large-scale mass protests, it has "by no means" failed, Hinrichs said.

=== Civil Disobedience ===
Hinrichs states that the Last Generation has shifted the public discourse and opened up a space for peaceful civil resistance, particularly for young people who had not previously been part of major social protest movements.

=== Democracy ===
Hinrichs posits that Germany is a "post-democratic state." She argues that the goal of "defending democracy" is, in the present day, both conservative and dangerous, as it implies that "everything should remain as it is." Things shouldnot remain as they are, pointing not only to the climate catastrophe but also to the resurgence of fascism.

== Publication ==
- Carla Hinrichs: Meine verletzte Generation. Tropen Verlag. ISBN 978-3-608-50525-2
