= Henning Jeschke =

German activist

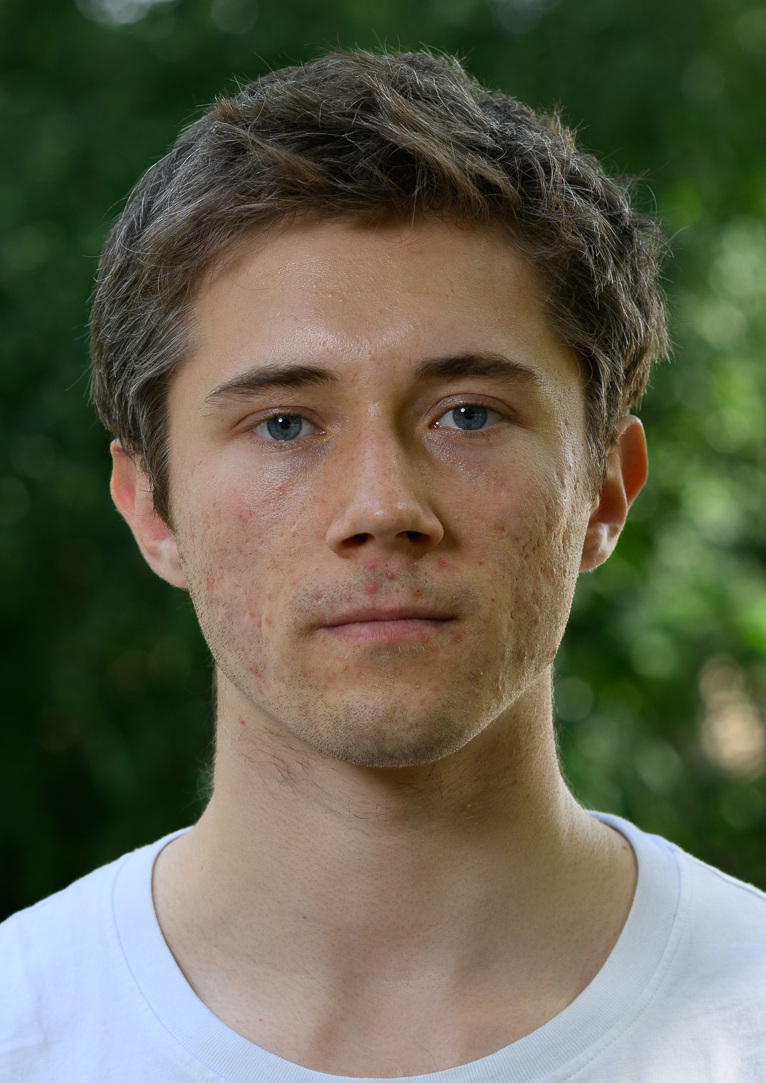
Jeschke in 2022

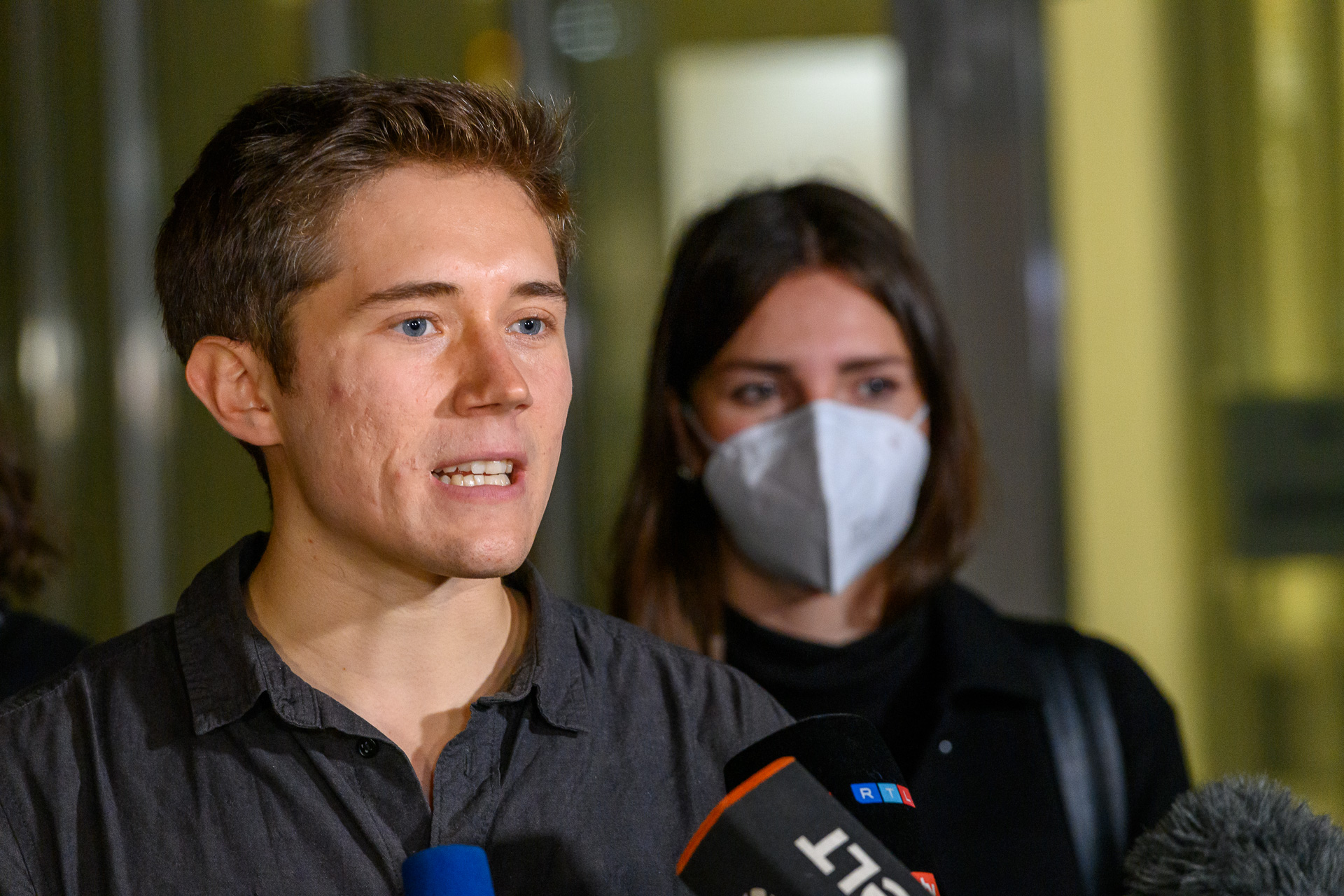
Jeschke in 2021

Henning Jeschke (born 2000 in Greifswald) is a German climate activist, and part of the activists group Last Generation (German: Letzte Generation). He used to study political science before turning to full-time activism. In February 2026, Jeschke faced legal proceedings, together with four other Last Generation activists, for allegedly forming a criminal organization.

== Life ==
Jeschke received considerable press coverage in 2021 being part of a hunger strike shortly before the federal election. The strikers had called on the three main chancellor candidates to publicly discuss measures against the climate crisis. Lina Eichler collapsed and was, like others, sent to hospital. The strike ended after four weeks when Olaf Scholz agreed to hold a conversation within the next month. The meeting eventually took place on 12 November 2021, with Jeschke being joined by fellow Last Generation activist Lea Bonasera.

The activist group Last Generation was formed by participants of the hunger strike, with Jeschke being one of the group's initiators. The group generated public discussions in Germany by blocking highways until February 2022 to raise awareness of food waste among the German public.

In August 2020, Jeschke and two other activists blocked an airplane from lifting off by gluing themselves to it. Jeschke was charged with coercion and expected the court to also address the topic of climate emergency, but the case was dropped unconditionally at the request of the prosecution.

The Last Generation group obtained funding from a group in California to continue to protest against the burning of oil, gas and coal. Eichler and Jeschke were interviewed to celebrate the group's first birthday.

As one of the main leaders of the group, which is suspected to be a criminal association, Jeschke's home was raided twice.

In March 2023, a Berlin Amtsgericht (district court) sentenced Jeschke, who was not present, to fines totaling 1,400 euros in relation to six protests between March and October 2022. During the trial, Jeschke had glued himself to a table in the courtroom and been removed after having refused to be detached from it. As the verdict was pronounced, Jeschke took part in a further protest which, according to a Last Generation, featured the table which he had glued himself to. A police spokesperson said that the table had been confiscated and would eventually be returned to the court.

In October 2023, Last Generation announced that Jeschke, together with two others, would leave the core group of Last Generation, which had consisted of six people, as he had begun engagement in a cross-national environmental activist network that adopts similar methods. All founding members of Last Generationen would retain vetoing rights.

In June 2024, a Berlin district court suspended the case concerning Jeschke having glued himself to a court table, stating that it would await the result of a trial at the Landgericht on charges against him regarding the formation of a criminal organization.

In early‑February 2026, Jeschke faced legal proceedings at the Potsdam Regional Court, together with four other Last Generation activists, for allegedly forming a criminal organization under §129 of the German Criminal Code. As of 9 February 2026, a trial date has not been set.
