= Fraunhofer Institute for Solar Energy Systems =

Research institution in Freiburg, Germany

- Founder: Adolf Goetzberger
- Established: 1981
- Focus: Solar thermal technology, applied optics and coatings, photovoltaics, building technology, hydrogen and fuel cell technology
- Director: Andreas Bett, Hans-Martin Henning
- Staff: 1400
- Address: Heidenhofstraße 2
- Location: Freiburg, Germany
- Website: www.ise.fraunhofer.de/en

The Fraunhofer Institute for Solar Energy Systems ISE (or Fraunhofer ISE) is an institute of the Fraunhofer-Gesellschaft. Located in Freiburg, Germany, the Institute performs applied scientific and engineering research and development for all areas of solar energy. Fraunhofer ISE has three external branches in Germany which carry out work on solar cell and semiconductor material development: the Laboratory and Service Center (LSC) in Gelsenkirchen, the Technology Center of Semiconductor Materials (THM) in Freiberg, and the Fraunhofer Center for Silicon Photovoltaics (CSP) in Halle. From 2006 to 2016 Eicke Weber was the director of Fraunhofer ISE. With over 1,100 employees, Fraunhofer ISE is the largest institute for applied solar energy research in Europe. The 2012 Operational Budget including investments was 74.3 million euro.

== History ==
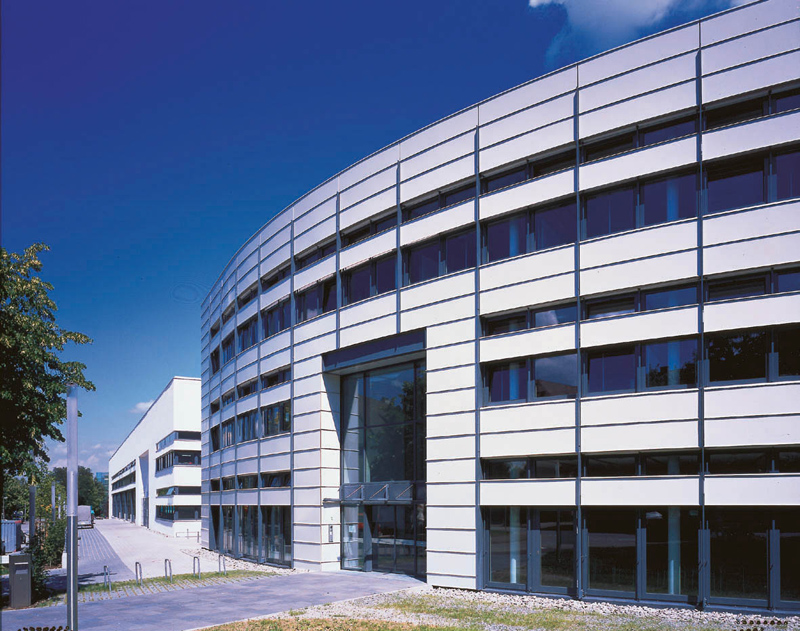
Front view of the Fraunhofer Institute for Solar Energy Systems ISE

Fraunhofer ISE was founded in 1981 by Adolf Goetzberger in Freiburg, Germany. It was the first non-university establishment for applied solar energy research in Europe. The first areas of focus were the fluorescent collector FLUKO, transparent insulation and the initial steps towards high efficiency silicon and III-V solar cells, silicon thin film solar cells and material research.

Already in 1983, the first fully electronic so-called "ISE inverter" was developed for use in autonomous photovoltaic systems. In 1986, the first serial product using fluorescent collectors as a power supply was produced. Within the PV small device program, numerous other successful products were developed. When the clean room was put into operation in 1989, the production of high efficiency solar cells began. In 1998, selective solar absorber coatings, which were developed at Fraunhofer ISE for solar thermal collectors, were put into industrial-scale production.

In 2011 Fraunhofer ISE celebrated its 30th anniversary. Since its founding, the scientists have received many prestigious prizes and awards for their research results in the field.

== Research and development ==
The solar energy research at Fraunhofer ISE establishes the technical prerequisites for an efficient and environmentally friendly energy supply for industrial as well as threshold and developing countries. The institute is committed to moving away from fossil fuels and nuclear power and moving towards a 100% renewable energy supply with the aim of providing affordable solutions for the energy transformation.

To this purpose, the institute develops materials, components, systems and processes for basic research and beyond. The areas of expertise include the development of production techniques and prototypes, setting up and monitoring demonstration systems and operating indoor and outdoor testing and calibration centers.

The various areas of research at Fraunhofer ISE are categorized into the following business areas:

=== Energy efficient buildings ===
At Fraunhofer ISE, energy-efficient buildings are one of the main areas of research. Teaming up with architects, expert planners and the industry, the researchers at Fraunhofer ISE optimize the performance of existing building and develop the buildings of tomorrow with consideration to the economic aspects, the energy efficiency and the user comfort. Through its involvement in the International Energy Agency (IEA), the Institute contributes in the establishment of the international boundary conditions for the realization of these concepts. In this business area, many disciplines come together: from material research and coating development through to component and system development and finally the required tests.

=== Applied optics and functional surfaces ===
Solar energy systems convert solar radiation incident on the earth into thermal, electrical or chemical energy. In order to better transmit, reflect, absorb, filter, redirect or concentrate the incoming radiation, Fraunhofer ISE develops optical components and systems. This business area serves as an interdisciplinary field and serves many areas of solar technology: windows and facades, solar thermal collectors, concentrator systems for photovoltaics and solar power plants as well as photovoltaic module technology.

=== Electrical energy storage ===
Only grid energy storage can guarantee a successful energy and mobility transition. High-performance batteries are therefore essential, especially for smart grids, to ensure grid stability. Furthermore, new electrical storage technologies ensure possibilities to deal with the increasing demand of mobile devices. However, all these goals require a sustainable circular economy, as specified by the European Battery Regulation. The department focuses on digitization as relevant topic too. Digitization is important regarding the areas of production, the use phase, and end-of-life (EOL). Moreover, these new approaches have to be faced in context of the battery passport.

=== Solar thermal systems ===
This business area covers the markets of low and high temperature applications. Solar thermal collectors and collector systems with flat or evacuated tube collectors find numerous applications in the practice. These include process water and solar heating systems, cooling and ventilation systems and sea water desalination systems. Also façade-integrated collectors are implemented. With linear concentrating collectors, operating temperatures from 150 °C to over 400 °C are achieved. Both trough and parabolic collectors are not only used for solar thermal power production in large power plants, but also in simpler and more cost-effective plants for the production of process heat, process steam and driving heat for absorption chillers.

=== Silicon photovoltaics ===
Especially due to the market introduction programs in Japan and Germany, the role of photovoltaics is gaining more and more on importance. More than 85% of the solar cells produced worldwide are based on crystalline silicon. The price-performance ratio, long-term stability and the cost-reduction potential indicate that this top performer in the terrestrial photovoltaic market will retain its place as market leader longer than just the next decade. Fraunhofer ISE's expertise ranges over the entire value chain of crystalline silicon photovoltaics, starting from material development and crystallization, through to solar cell processing and photovoltaic module technology.

=== Photovoltaic modules and systems ===
Module technology converts solar cells into a product for operation in PV power plants. Fraunhofer ISE supports the product development concentrating on increasing efficiencies, reducing costs, and achieving the highest reliability. Institute offers its services for quality assurance of modules and power plants.

=== Alternative photovoltaic technologies ===
In addition to silicon photovoltaics, the solar cell research at Fraunhofer ISE also extends to other photovoltaic technologies: With III-V based semiconductors like gallium indium phosphide, aluminum gallium arsenide or gallium arsenide, the highest efficiencies can be reached today. The technology of the dye solar cells has developed well beyond the laboratory stage and organic solar cells are attractive especially due to the expected low manufacturing costs.

=== Renewable power supply ===
The construction of grid-connected systems is the largest market for the photovoltaic branch today. The Institute provides consultancy services for system planning, characterizes solar modules and carries out the technical analysis and performance testing of photovoltaic systems.

Off-grid power supplies also are a focus of the ongoing research at the institute. People living in remote rural areas, the countless number of telecommunication systems, environmental measurement technology as well as portable electronic devices require an autonomous power supply, independent of the grid. Fraunhofer ISE develops renewable energy systems for this purpose.

Fraunhofer ISE also performs research in the area of power electronics and controls. This includes inverter development and testing in a modern power electronics laboratory as well as research in the field of energy management including smart metering and smart grids.

In future, vehicles will run partly or completely on electricity and draw their energy from the grid (electric and plug-in). Fraunhofer ISE is working at the interface between the vehicles and the grid on concepts for an environmentally acceptable power supply and the optimal integration of the vehicles into the electricity grid, including metering and billing systems.

=== Hydrogen technology ===
In a fuel cell, hydrogen reacts with oxygen and sets useful energy free in the form of electricity and heat. Since hydrogen does not exist in its pure form in nature, it must be produced from one of its many chemical compounds. At Fraunhofer ISE in the area of hydrogen technology, the research focuses on innovative technologies for hydrogen generation and on processes for the highly efficient conversion of hydrogen into electricity and heat using the most modern equipment. Together with partners from industry and science, components and complete fuel cell systems are developed for autonomous, portable as well as mobile applications.

== Service units ==
Presently the following certified test labs provide testing and calibration services at the laboratories:

- TestLab Solar Thermal Systems
- TestLab Solar Facades
- TestLab PV Modules
- CalLab PV Cells
- CalLab PV Modules

Other service establishments at the laboratories are:

- Quality Assurance of PV Power Plants
- Photovoltaic Power Electronics
- Inverter Laboratory
- Battery Testing Laboratory
- Lighting Laboratory
- Laboratory for Vapour Compression Heat Pumps
- Phase Change Materials (PCM) Laboratory
- Testing Laboratory for Adsorption Materials and Porous Materials
- TestLab Fuel Cells

== Cooperation ==
The Institute is one of the founding members and the Member-in-Charge of the Fraunhofer Energy Alliance, comprising sixteen Fraunhofer institutes with expertise in energy technology and energy research.

The Institute is a member of the ForschungsVerbund Erneuerbare Energien (FVEE) and the European Renewable Energy Research Centres Agency (EUREC), as well as other alliances.

The Institute maintains a close cooperation with the Material Research Center of the University of Freiburg, which assists the Institute with fundamental research. Th institute director holds a faculty position at that University as professor of physics and applied sciences.

== Spin-offs ==
To date, seven spin-off companies have been founded from the applied research results at Fraunhofer ISE. Among them are the following:

- In 1999, PSE AG was founded to provide services and expertise on solar energy. In addition to compiling studies and reports, the company provides measurement and control technology and custom-made laboratory equipment.
- In 2001, Holotools GmbH (now temicon GmbH - holotools) was founded to develop and manufacture functional surfaces for the management of light. One particular expertise, for example, is the production of large-area homogeneous microstructures for optical surfaces.
- In 2002, SorTech AG (renamed Fahrenheit AG as of March 2017) was spun off to exploit heat sources for producing cold, thus using low temperature heat as an energy source instead of electricity. As a result, Fahrenheit advanced the underlying technology, adsorption cooling, and produces chillers which use residual heat from a variety of sources to economically generate cold.
- Soitec Solar, founded in 2005, brought an innovative photovoltaic technology using concentrated sunlight to the market. With this technology, photovoltaic power stations from 100 kW up to several megawatts are further developed, manufactured, and installed.
- In 2014, Enit Energy IT Systems GmbH was spun off to develop and market energy management systems for medium-sized enterprises. These systems help customers gain more transparency about their electricity, heat and gas consumption. In addition, the company's products enable intelligent system control and more efficient operation.

== Staff, infrastructure and financing ==
The laboratory has a staff of 1139, of whom 439 hold permanent positions. (as of 04/2012).

The research institute has a net floor area of 21,000 m^{2} which contains offices, laboratories and test fields. New labs and office space are presently under construction.

The 2011 operational budget totaled €61.3 million. Just five percent of the operational budget was basic funding, 90% from German federal funds and 10% from German state funds. About 50% was from contract research with industry; the remainder stemmed from public and other sources. In 2011, annual investments amounted to €7.7 million. (as of 04/2012)
