= Léonore Porchet =

Swiss politician (born 1989)

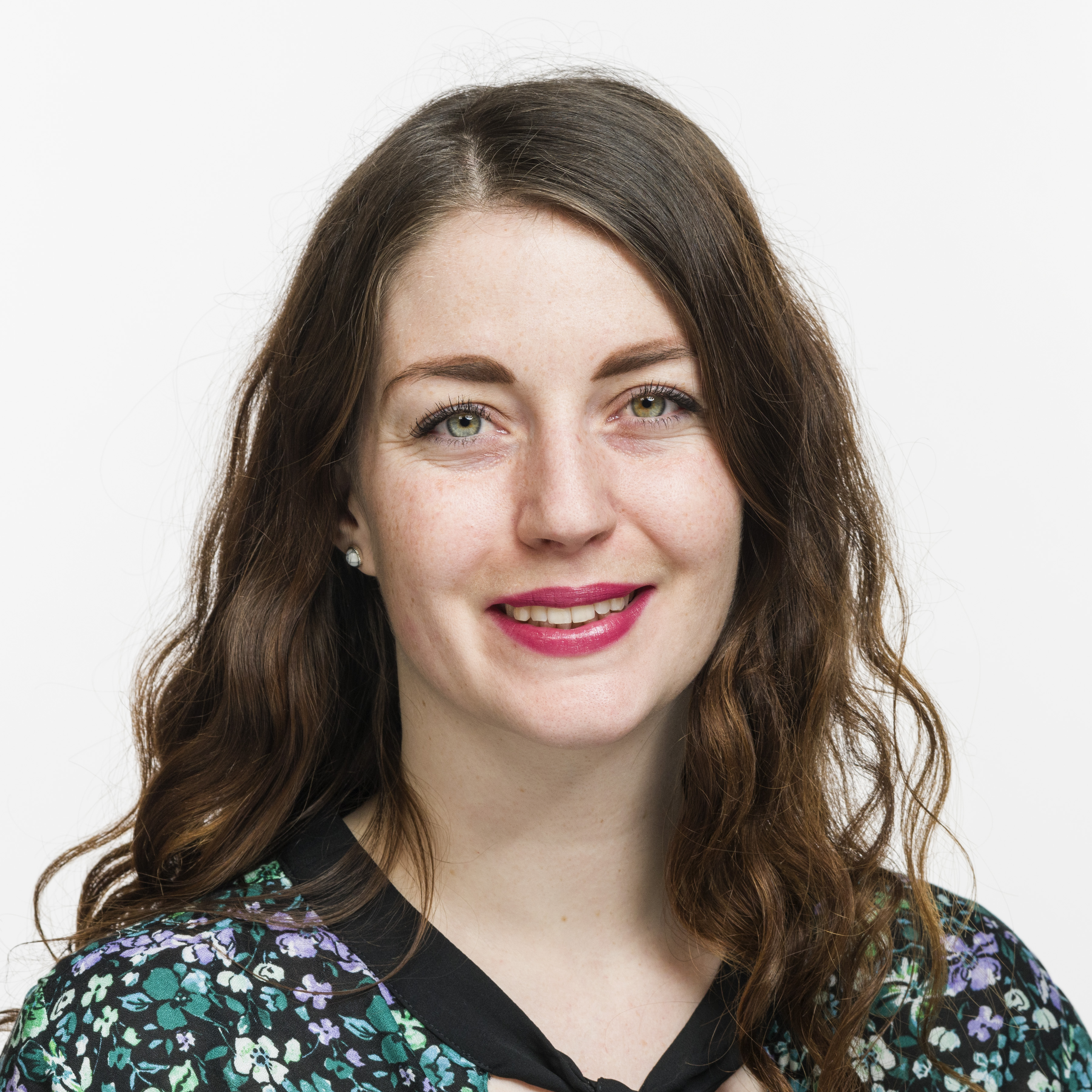
Léonare porchet portrait

Léonore Porchet (born 9 July 1989) is a Swiss politician. A member of the Green Party of Switzerland, Porchet has represented Vaud canton in the National Council since the 2019 Swiss federal election.

== Biography ==
Léonore Porchet was born on 9 July 1989 in Châtel-Saint-Denis, but grew up in the town of Muntelier.

Porchet spent her youth in the northern part of Vaud, then studied history and art at University of Lausanne, where she received her Master of Letters degree in 2015. Her thesis focused on the use of comics as political communication in Geneva.

Porchet began her career as a communications specialist and project manager, specializing in health, culture and urban planning. At the end of 2019, she began working as a freelance professional.

== Political career ==
Porchet served as a Communal Councilor and leader of the Greens in Lausanne from 2015 to 2017 and was later elected to the Grand Council of Vaud Canton in 2017. In the 2019 Swiss federal election, Porchet was elected to the National Council.

During her political career, Porchet has focused on issues around equality, combatting street harassment, health, universal basic income, career training for students, arts and culture, as well as mobility and exercise.

In the National Council, Porchet sits on the Public Health and Social Security Committee, the National Security Committee and the Judicial Committee.

Outside of her political work, Porchet has been on the board of the diabetes charity Diabète Vaud since 2019 and has been president of the Organization EyesUp since 2018.

Prior to the 2015 Swiss federal election, Porchet was featured on MoiCandidat.ch, a documentary series by Radio Télévision Suisse that followed candidates on the campaign trail.
