= Act now! =

Swiss civil resistance campaign

- Type: Advocacy group
- Purpose: Climate change mitigation and energy transition
- Region served: Switzerland
- Website: weactnow.ch

Act now is a Swiss civil resistance group founded in April 2022 which uses non-violent actions to combat climate change. It is best known for their first campaign Renovate Switzerland which put pressure the Swiss Federal Council to implement a national plan to insulate one million homes by 2040, in order to address the issues of climate change and the energy crisis. It is part of an international network of civil resistance campaigns, with similar actions taking place in Germany, Australia, Canada, France, Italy, Norway, the United Kingdom and the United States. These different campaigns share similar tactics, but focus on demands that are specific to their national context. Several of them do however focus on the issue of the energy consumption of buildings.

Renovate Switzerland had initially sent a letter exposing their demands to the President of the Swiss Confederation Simonetta Sommaruga, however the response they received fell short of their expectations. After four roadblocks in April 2022, the campaign entered a new action phase in October 2022. Co-author of the UN IPCC report Julia Steinberger participated to a roadblock in Bern on October 11, and glued her hand to the asphalt alongside five other people.

Most of the actions of Act now involve roadblocks of major Swiss motorways and roads. While their actions are generally considered illegal, they are supported by some politicians such as Swiss Green Party Léonore Porchet, who views civil disobedience to be legitimate given the urgency of the climate crisis.

== Controversies ==
The logo of Renovate Switzerland is suspected to infringe on the Rivella drink logo trademark, and the company said they are considering legal action. Due to this situation, Renovate Switzerland has changed its corporate design.
