= Riposte (magazine) =

UK-based arts magazine

Riposte is a UK-based independent biannual print magazine about art and culture, with a focus on women's issues.

== History ==
Riposte was launched in 2013 by Danielle Pender, then curator of the KK Outlet gallery in London, and Shaz Madani, a visual designer. The first 128-page issue featured Nelly Ben Hayoun, Françoise Mouly, Bethany Cosentino, Es Devlin and Linder.

In 2014, Riposte was among the magazines showcased in The Guardian's article 'The beautiful magazines setting out to prove print isn't dead'. It then landed advertising deals with Nike and Fred Perry. During the mid-2010s, women's issues rose to high levels in public debates, opening up a wider audience for Riposte. For the fourth issue, Riposte partnered with The Anonymous Sex Journal to elaborate an erotica article. After the March 2020 covid lockdown, the magazine almost went out of business as event and brand partnerships got cancelled. The magazine relaunched in May 2021 with a complete design overhaul.

== Description ==
The magazine was launched as an "antidote to mass-market women’s magazines". The magazine follows a "54321" format: 5 ideas, 4 meetings, 3 features, 2 essays, 1 icon. Photos in the magazine are not photoshopped, and the magazine is printed on a high-quality paper.

Displaying only text on the cover was an idea inspired by the February 1950 issue of National Geographic.

== See also ==
- List of art magazines
