= Eicke Weber =

German physicist

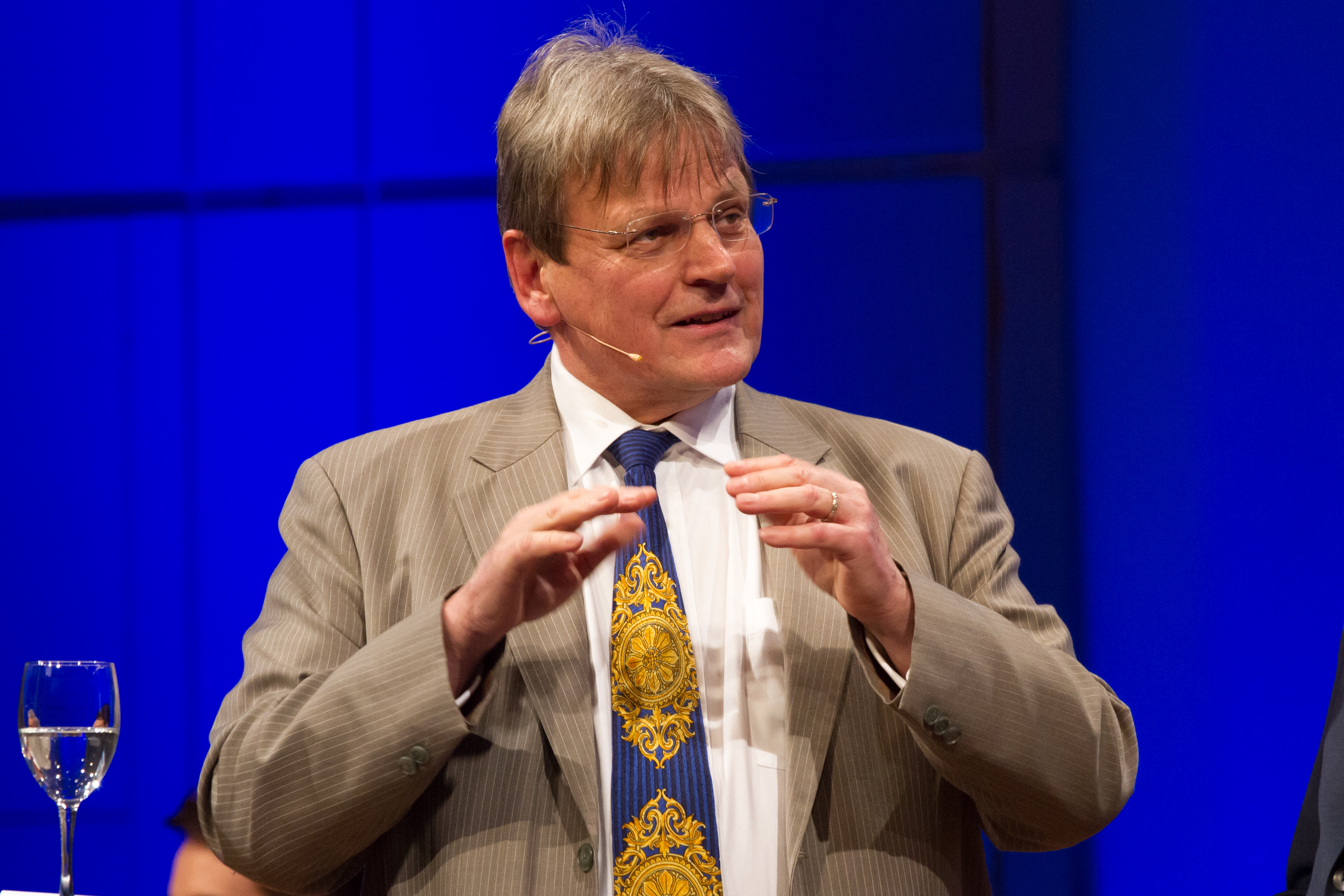
Eicke Weber speaking at the FDP Baden-Württemberg party conference in 2015

Eicke Richard Weber (born 28 October 1949 in Münnerstadt) is a German physicist.

== Life ==
=== Scientific activity ===
Weber grew up from 1955 in Cologne, where he also took his Abitur. He studied mathematics and physics at the University of Cologne from 1967. After graduating in 1972, he took on an assistant position at the RWTH Aachen and finished his doctorate in physics in 1976 with the topic Point Defects in Deformed Silicon and received his Ph.D. His habilitation followed in 1983 with the topic Transition Metals in Silicon. Weber joined the faculty of the Department of Materials Science and Engineering, University of California, Berkeley, first as Assistant in 1983, than Associate and since 2001 as Full Professor, and stayed there for 23 years, until he accepted in 2006 a call from the Fraunhofer society. He spent one research semester each as a visiting professor at Tōhoku-Gakuin University in Sendai, and Kyoto University in Japan. In Berkeley, he served 2004–06 as founding Chair of the Interdisciplinary Nanoscale Science and Engineering Graduate Group. From July 2006 to December 2016, he was director of the Fraunhofer Institute for Solar Energy Systems (ISE) in Freiburg, Germany. In addition to his position as Director of ISE, he held the Chair of Physics/Solar Energy at the Albert Ludwigs University of Freiburg. From 2012 to 2016, he served also as executive director of the Centre for Renewable Energies at the University of Freiburg. He then worked as the Director of the Berkeley Education Alliance for Research in Singapore (BEARS) from January 2017 to May 2018.

In 2002, Weber and colleagues founded the German Scholars Organization (GSO), of which he remains president today. In 2013, he and colleagues founded the German Energy Storage Association, until 2016 he was BVES President, since then Honorary President. In 2016, he was appointed to the Economic Senate of the German Association of Small and Medium-Sized Businesses (BVMW), since March 2020 he is heading the BVMW Commission for Energy and Sustainable Economy.

In the course of his scientific work, he has authored or co-authored 618 papers.

=== Politics ===
In 2016, he ran unsuccessfully for the Free Democratic Party in the state elections in Baden-Württemberg in the electoral district Freiburg II. He is co-president of the European Solar Manufacturing Council (ESMC), an interest group of companies and research institutions for the production of photovoltaic systems in the European Union. As such, he considers the complete supply of Germany by green electricity by 2030 to be plausible, provided that appropriate measures are taken.

== Offices ==
- since 2003: President of the German Scholars Organization
- 2004–2006: Chair of the Berkeley Nanoscale Science and Engineering Graduate Group
- 2008–2014: Director of the SEMI International Board of Directors
- 2008–2012 Member of the Meyer Burger Board of Directors, from 2010 of the Technology Advisory Board
- 2011–2013: Member of the Q-Cells Supervisory Board
- 2013–2016: President of the German Energy Storage Association (BVES), since then Honorary President
- 2015–2017: President, Association of European Renewable Energy Research Centers (EUREC)
- since 2019: co-president of the European Solar Manufacturing Council (ESMC)

== Awards ==
- 1994: Humboldt-Senior US Scientist Award
- 2001: Fellow of the American Physical Society
- 2006: Bundesverdienstkreuz am Bande
- 2009: Honorary member of the Joffe-Institute (PTI) of the Russian Academy of Sciences, St. Petersburg, Russia
- 2009: Electronics and Photonics Division Award of the Electrochemical Society (ECS), San Francisco
- 2010: Member of the Deutsche Akademie der Technikwissenschaften (ACATECH)
- 2013: Einstein Award of Solar World
- 2014: Fraunhofer-Medaille
- 2015: Walter-Scheel-Preis of the Friedrich Naumann Foundation for Freedom
- 2016: Rudolf-Jaeckel-Preis of the Deutsche Vakuumgesellschaft
- 2018: Lifetime Achievement Award, International Solar Business Club SBC

== Publications (selection) ==
- (ed.) PV rollout. Boston, USA, February 10th/11th, 2011. European American Solar Deployment Conference. OTTI, Regensburg 2011, ISBN 978-3-941785-52-6.
- Punktfehler in verformtem Silizium. Cologne, Univ., Diss., 1976.

=== Articles ===
- with S. Glunz, H. M. Henning, A. Palzer, R. Schindler: Low-cost Harvesting of Solar Energy. The Future of Global Photovoltaics, in: G. Eisenstein, D. Bimberg (ed.): Green Photonics and Electronics, Springer International, Heidelberg 2018, p. 215–262.
- with N. M. Haegel, R. Margolis, T. Buonassisi, D. Feldman, A. Froitzheim, R. Garabedian, M. Green, S. Glunz, H. M. Henning, B. Holder, I. Kaizuka, B. Kroposki, K. Matsubara, S. Niki, K. Sakurai, R. A. Schindler, W. Tumas, G. Wilson, M. Woodhouse, S. Kurtz: Terawatt-scale Photovoltaics. Trajectories and Challenges, in: Science 356, 141 (2017).
- with T. Buonassisi, A. A. Istratov, M. A. Marcus, B. Lai, Z. Cai, S. M. Heald: Engineering metal-impurity nanodefects for low-cost solar cells, in: Nature Materials 4, 676 (2005).
- Understanding Defects in Semiconductors as Key to Advancing Device Technology, in: Physica B340-342, 1 (2003) (Plenary opening talk of ICDS-22).
- with M. H. Huang, S. Mao, H. Feick, H. Yan, Y. Wu, H. Kind, R. Russo, P. D. Yang: Room-Temperature Ultraviolet Nanowire Nanolasers, in: Science 292, 1897 (2001).
- with M. H. Huang, Y. Wu, H. Feick, N. Tran, P. Yang: Catalytic Growth of Zinc Oxide Nanowires by Vapor Transport, in: Adv. Mater. 13, 113 (2001).
- with C. Flink, H. Feick, S. A. McHugo, W. Seifert, H. Hieslmair, T. Heiser, A. A. Istratov: Out-Diffusion and Precipitation of Copper in Silicon. An Electrostatic Model, in: Phys. Rev. Lett. 85, 4900 (2000).
- with A. A. Istratov, C. Flink, H. Hieslmair, T. Heiser: Intrinsic Diffusion Coefficient of Interstitial Copper in Silicon, in: Phys. Rev. Lett. 81, 1243 (1998).
- with J. F. Zheng, X. Liu, N. Newman, D. F. Ogletree, M. Salmeron: Scanning Tunneling Microscopy Studies of Si Donors in GaAs, in: Phys. Rev. Lett. 72, 1490 (1994).
- with D. Gilles, S. Hahn: Mechanism of Internal Gettering of Interstitial Impurities in Czochralski-Grown Silicon, in: Phys. Rev. Lett. 64, 196 (1990).
- with K. S. Jones, S. Prussin: A Systematic Analysis of Defects in Ion Implanted Silicon, in: Appl. Phys. A 45, 1 (1988).
- with W. E. Spicer, Z. Liliental-Weber, N. Newman, T. Kendelewicz, R. Cao, C. McCants, P. H. Mahowald, K. Miyano, I. Lindau: The Advanced Unified Defect Model for Schottky Barrier Formation, in: J. Vac. Sci. Techn. B 6, 1245 (1988).
- with K. Khachaturyan, P. Tejedor, A. M. Stacey, A. M. Portis: Microwave Observation of Magnetic Field Penetration of high-Tc Superconducting Oxides, in: Phys. Rev. B 36, 8309 (1987).
- Transition Metals in Silicon, in: Appl. Phys. A 30, 1 (1983).
- with H. Ennen, U. Kaufmann, J. Windscheif, J. Schneider, T. Wosinski: Identification of AsGa Antisites in Plastically Deformed GaAs, in: J. Appl. Phys. 53, 6140 (1982).
