= Last Generation (climate movement) =

German environmental organization

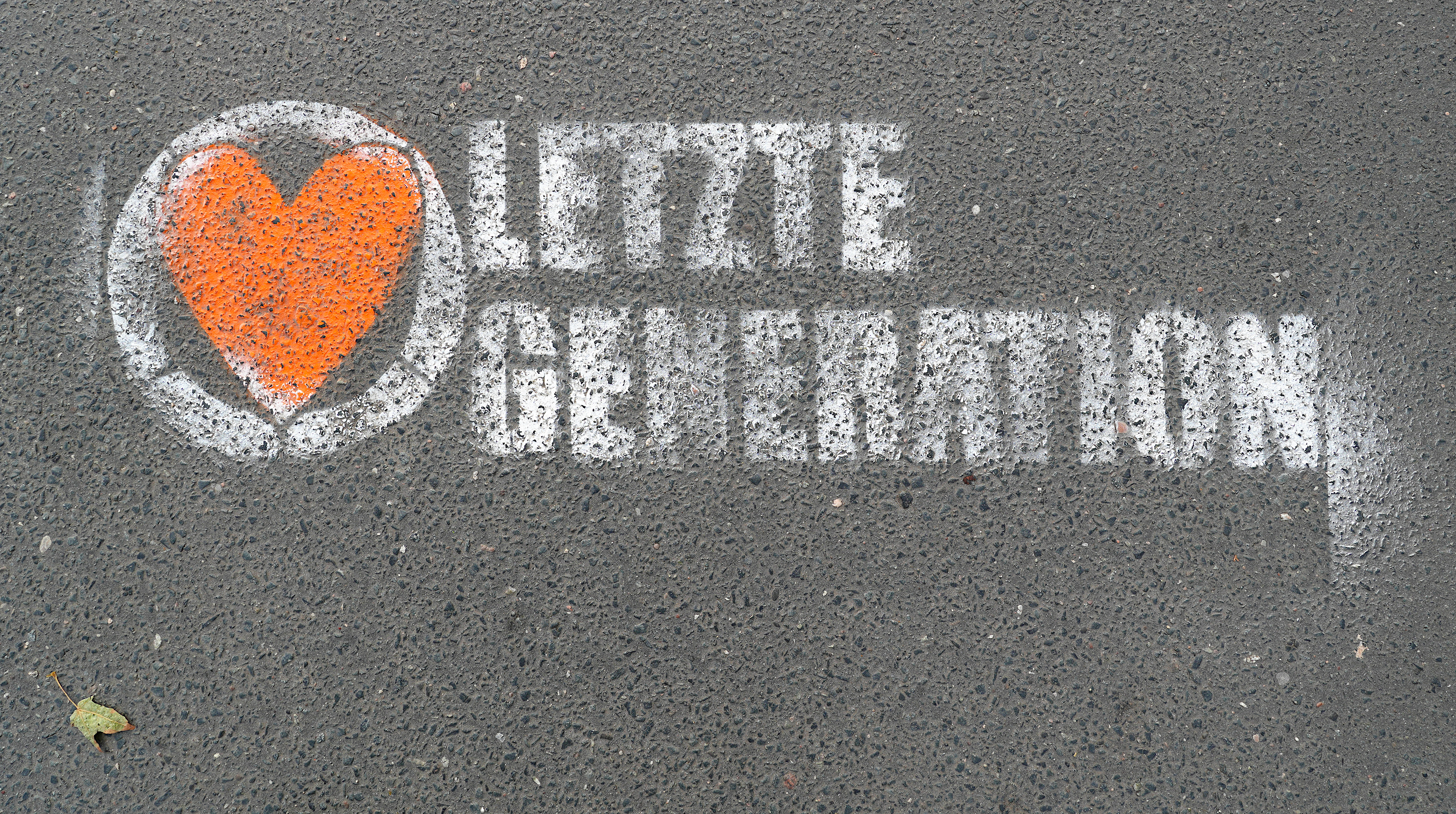
- Successor: Neue Generation; Widerstands-Kollektiv
- Established: 2021
- Dissolved: 2025
- Type: NGO
- Purpose: Climate activism; Nonviolent direct action
- Website: letztegeneration.org
- Remarks: German translation: Letzte Generation

Letzte Generation (political association) Parlament aufmischen – Stimme der Letzten Generation
- President: Henning Jeschke
- Membership: 41
- European Parliament: 0 / 720

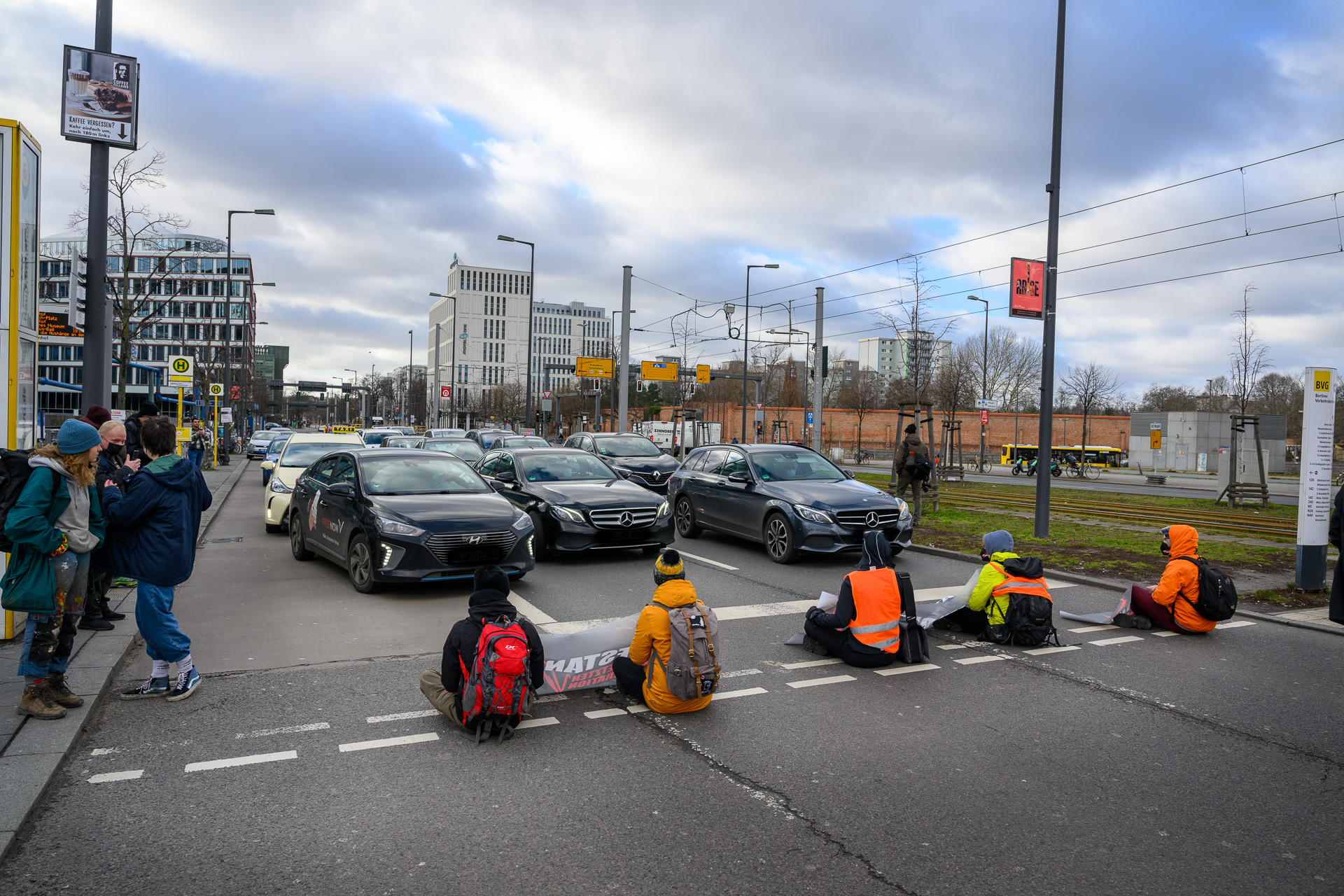
Road blocks at Berlin Central station (2022)

The Last Generation (German: Letzte Generation, pronounced [ˈlɛt͡stə ˌɡeːnəʁaˈt͡sjoːn], Italian: Ultima Generazione, Polish: Ostatnie pokolenie) was a group of climate change activists using forms of direct action which is mostly active in Germany, Italy, Poland and Canada. It describes itself as an "alliance" and was formed in 2021 from participants in the Hungerstreik der letzten Generation [de] ("last generation hunger strike"). The term was chosen because they considered themselves to be the last generation before tipping points in the earth's climate system would be reached. The Austria section of Last Generation announced in August 2024 that it would end its activities under that name.

The group has staged direct non-violent actions including numerous road blockades (276 in Germany over the course of 2022) and used paint to vandalise yachts, notorious paintings, buildings, restaurants and private jets. Protests in Germany were mainly focused on car usage and traffic policy, while those in Italy focused on cultural assets.

The civil disobedience methods of the group met with mixed reactions from the public, including expressions of outrage and threats of violence. They also received criticism for their disruptive nature.

In January 2024, the group announced that it would no longer stage road blockades, shifting instead to what it called "disobedient public assemblies" and increase protests at facilities such as oil pipelines, energy company headquarters and airports. In late 2024 such protests were still organized. Media described the group's decision to end road blockades as having been due to hostility, fines, and prison sentences. On 26 February 2025, Letzte Generation announced its reorganization into two successor organizations: Neue Generation and Widerstandskollektiv. Neue Generation [translation: New Generation] will expand its focus beyond climate activism to include the defense and promotion of democratic values in Germany. Meanwhile, Widerstandskollektiv [translation: Resistance collective] will emphasize direct actions against environmental destruction and social injustice.

== Goals and views ==
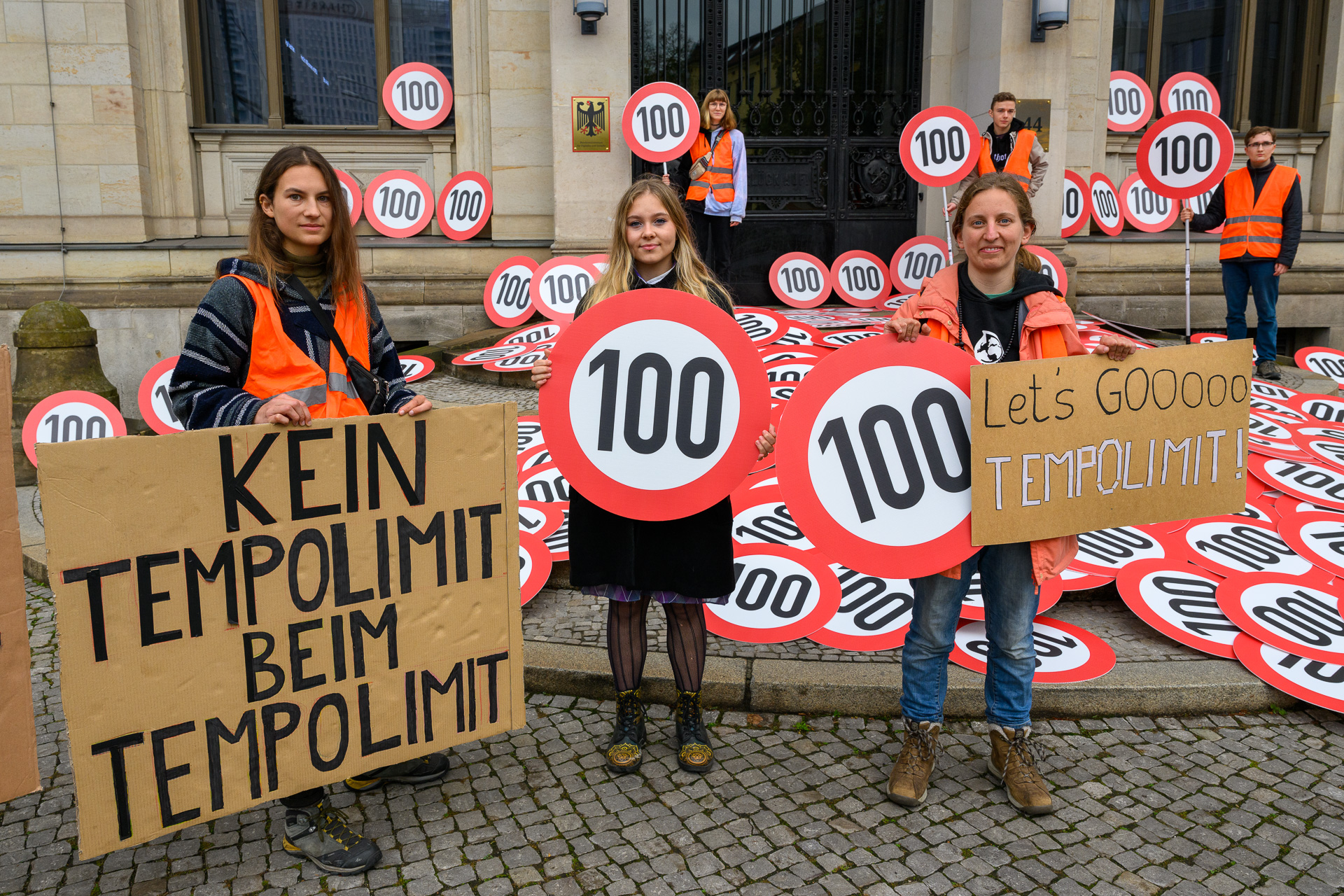
Activists from the Last Generation bring speed limit 100 km/h signs to the German Ministry of Transport.

The group stated that there was a climate emergency and that the cost of solving it should be borne by those with high income. The group further demanded a debt cut and payments to states of the Global South as compensation for climate change, the introduction of a general speed limit of 100 km/h on the autobahn, and a permanent 9-Euro-Ticket. It claimed that the German government was knowingly breaking its own climate protection goals.

In early 2023, the group declared the democratic process to be unfit for dealing with the climate crisis and demanded the implementation of "Society councils" to work out emergency measures. The members of those councils should be selected by sortition from various backgrounds and age classes. Existing conventional political institutions would be obliged to implement the councils' decisions exactly as agreed.

In February 2024, the group announced its intention to contest the 2024 EU Parliament elections in Germany. It obtained 0.3% of the German vote and thus no seats. It also fell short of the 0.5% required to obtain German public funding for political parties. The group did not run in Austria, Italy, or Poland.

In mid‑December 2024, the organization announced its relaunch under a new name and strategy in 2025. It did so in late‑February 2025.

== History of actions ==
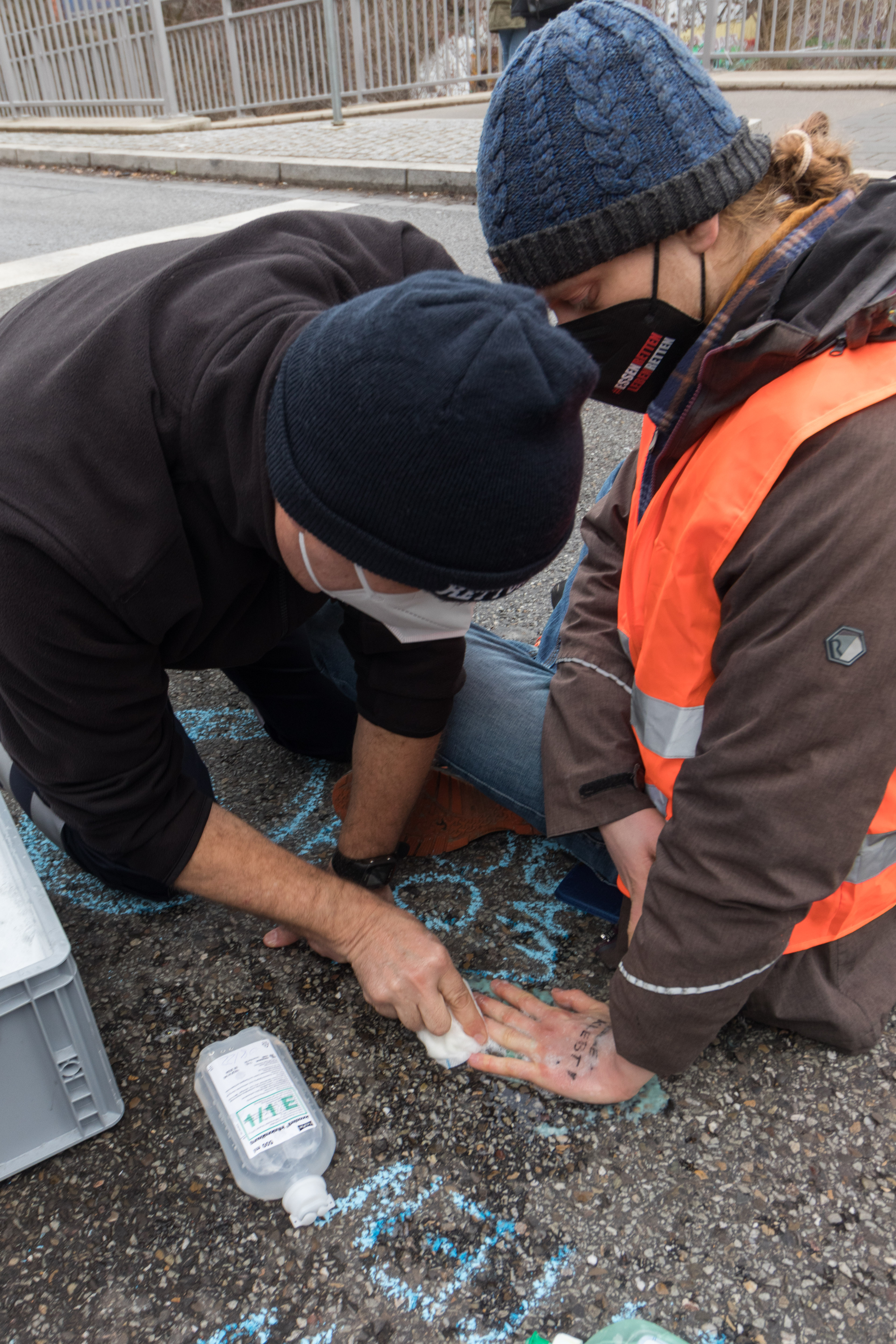
A Freiburg emergency doctor uses solving agent to remove the palm of a Last Generation activist from street asphalt. The back of the activist's hand shows text about the glue (2022).

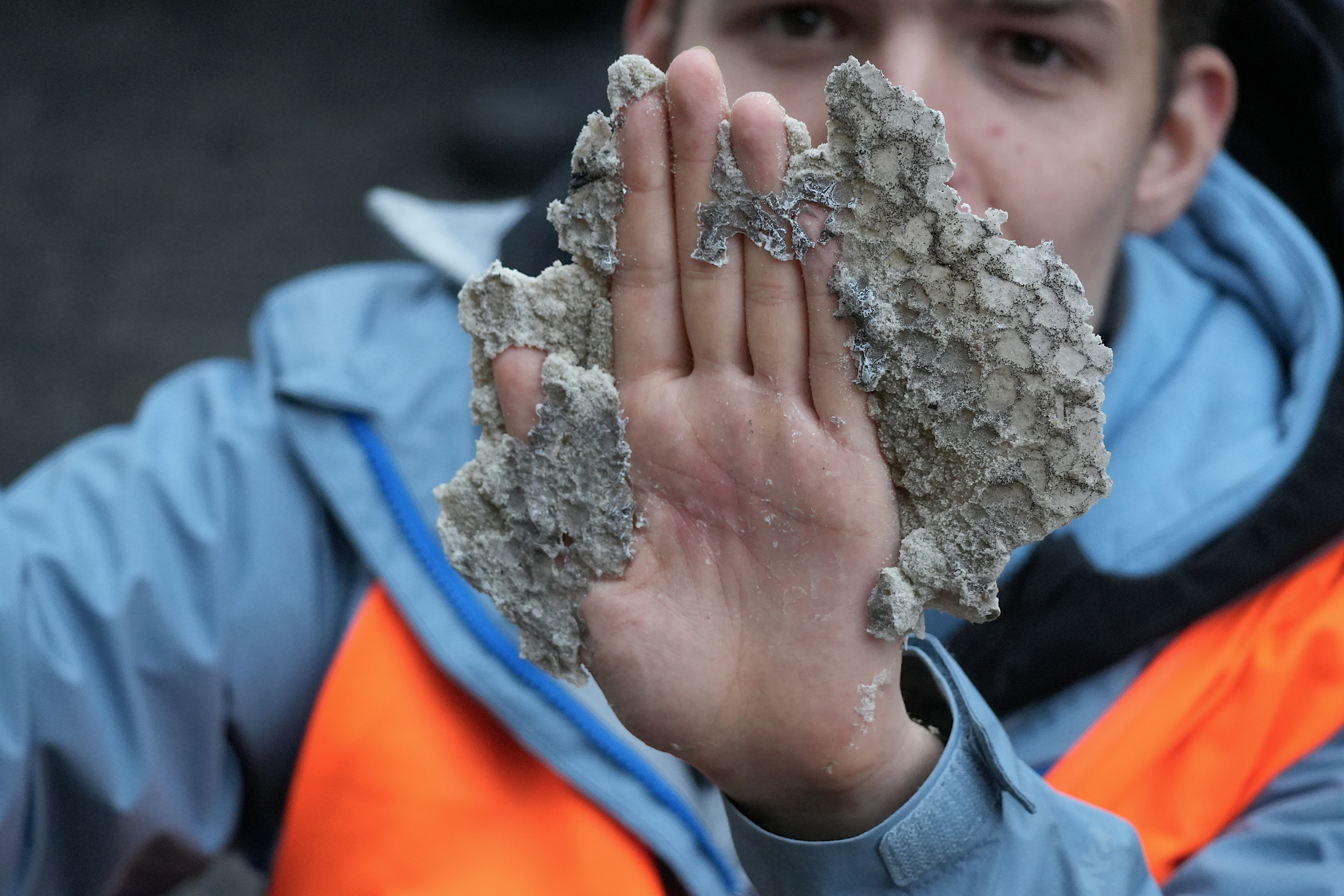
A Letzte Generation activist with his hand caked in cyanoacrylate glue and sand following removal by the Berlin police using acetone solvent (2023)

At the beginning of the movement, besides road blockades, the group also frequently distributed food from dumpsters for free. Both methods were used in early 2022 to support their demand for a law against food loss and waste.

The Last Generation performed about 370 actions between January and October 2022.

In October 2022, two Last Generation activists threw mashed potatoes at a Monet painting behind glass, titled Haystacks, part of a collection founded by Hasso Plattner, a German billionaire, at the Museum Barberini in Potsdam, Germany. Plattner had reportedly paid €111 million for the painting in 2019. The painting was left undamaged. However, the museum stated that the frame was damaged, and estimated that its restoration would incur a five-figure cost in euros. In November 2022, the Last Generation threw soup at 'The Sower' by Vincent van Gogh, also behind glass, at the Palazzo Bonaparte in Rome, Italy. The painting, which was on loan from the Dutch Kröller-Müller Museum, suffered no damage, like another van Gogh painting targeted by a similar protest by Just Stop Oil two weeks earlier in London; high-profile stunts involving artwork were seen as a common element of the two groups.

In November 2022, activists from Letzte Generation cut the fence at Berlin Brandenburg Airport in two places and entered the runway, causing an interruption of operations of nearly two hours.

Last Generation also blockaded highways, such as in Berlin. In February 2023, motorists attempted to remove Last Generation protesters from a motorway near the event venue ICC Berlin, with one car driver running over a protester's foot. The police were at the scene and initiated criminal proceedings against the driver, on suspicion of simple bodily harm.

On the morning of 20 February 2023 Ultima Generazione Italia blocked traffic in via Luigi Sturzo, and among the activists there was also a person with disabilities.

In April 2023, the group protested at the Berlin ePrix, a Formula E electric car race, by gluing themselves to the track and support vehicles right before the start. That same month, the use by police of pain compliance techniques to disperse a Letzte Generation road blockade came under public and legal scrutiny in Germany.

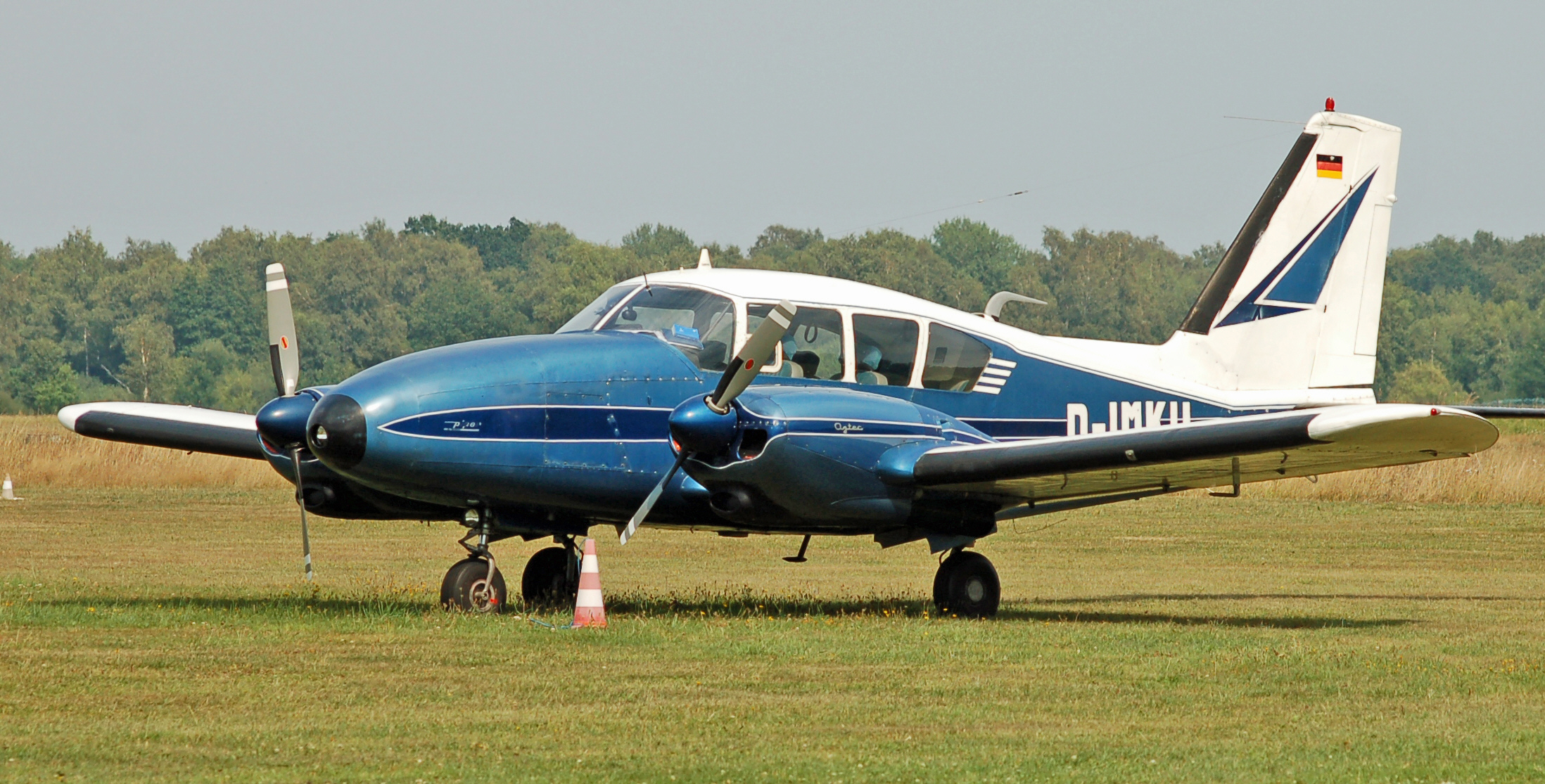
An Aztec airplane of the type vandalised by Letzte Generation in Berlin in May 2023

In May 2023, Letzte Generation spray-painted a Piper PA-23 'Aztec' private airplane at Berlin airport, causing an estimated 72,000 euros worth of damage to the aircraft. In the same month, in Vienna, an emergency patient died in congestion caused by the group. A speaker of the group stated that it had made the mistake of not informing the ambulance service centre.

On 23 May 2023, two activists from the group poured mud over themselves outside the Senate building in Rome to protest fossil fuel use. They also drew attention to the devastating effects of floods linked to climate change, such as those which had recently hit the Emilia-Romagna region. The group had previously poured charcoal-based liquid into the Trevi Fountain in Rome and glued themselves to a piece of art in the Uffizi Gallery in Florence.

In June 2023, shortly after an announcement by the group that it would soon carry out a string of actions specifically targeting "the rich", who in their view contributed overproportionately to climate change, sprayed orange paint onto a private jet (reported as make Cessna CJ1) in Sylt, as well as several buildings. The same month, it spray-painted the Lady M, a 30-metre private yacht of a German company owner on the German Baltic coast.

Two activists from the Last Generation group in Italy were detained in 13 February 2024 after they stuck several photographs of flooding on Botticelli's painting The Birth of Venus displayed at the Uffizi Gallery in Florence. They demanded a €20 billion fund to help climate disaster victims.

On 3 March 2024, two activists interrupted a concert in honor of Polish conductor Antoni Wit at the National Philharmonic.They were later sentenced to 20 hours of unpaid community service

On 18 May 2024, six climate activists entered Munich Airport using bolt cutters to cut through the fence in two locations, and glued themselves to the access routes leading to runways. During the two-hour disruption, some 60 flights were cancelled and 14 re-routed. On 24 and 25 July, groups of Last Generation activists entered Cologne Bonn Airport and Frankfurt Airport by cutting fences, reaching respectively the runway and apron and causing hours-long interruptions in both cases. Further protests took place in mid-August at Berlin Brandenburg Airport, Stuttgart Airport, Nürnberg Airport and Cologne Bonn Airport, without runways being entered. Flight operations in Nürnberg and Cologne Bonn were briefly suspended.

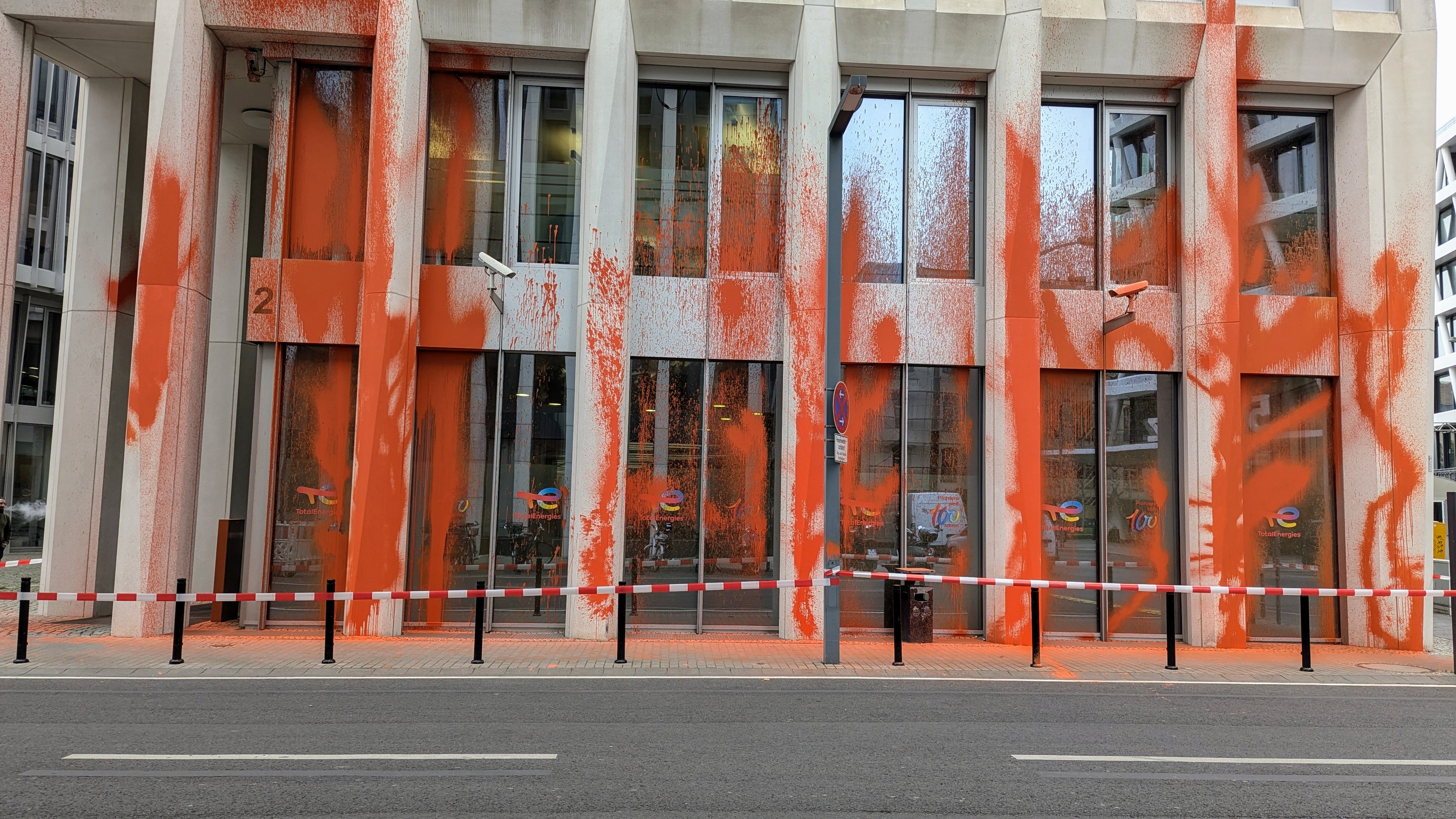
TotalEnergies's office building in Berlin in November 2024

In August 2024, Last Generation Austria announced in a letter to its supporters that it would dissolve, saying that it no longer saw a "perspective of success" and accusing the government of having acted the previous two years with "complete incompetence" in climate protection matters.

On 6 November 2024, Last Generation activists sprayed the Tour TotalEnergies building in Berlin-Moabit, where the energy company of the same name has its German headquarters, with orange paint. The purpose of the protest was to raise awareness ahead of the planned gas summit, which is to discuss the supply of LNG, among other things.

The group announced in January 2024 that it would end road blockades. Media later ascribed the decision as having been due to hostility, fines, and prison sentences.

On 1 June 2025 activists, identified as an offshoot of the "Last Generation", acting under the name "New Generation", attempted to blockade the Axel Springer SE printing plant in Berlin-Spandau by using a van. They claimed to fight "autocrats" and "facists" by preventing the timely delivery of the Bild tabloid. Some 30 protesters were arrested. Another blockade followed on early morning 4 June 2025, with several activists glueing themself to vans, they had parked in front of the printing plant.

In February 2026, law student Carla Hinrichs published a paperback outlining her experiences with Last Generation and her arrest under §129 of the German Criminal Code for allegedly forming a criminal organization.

== Accusations and sentences ==
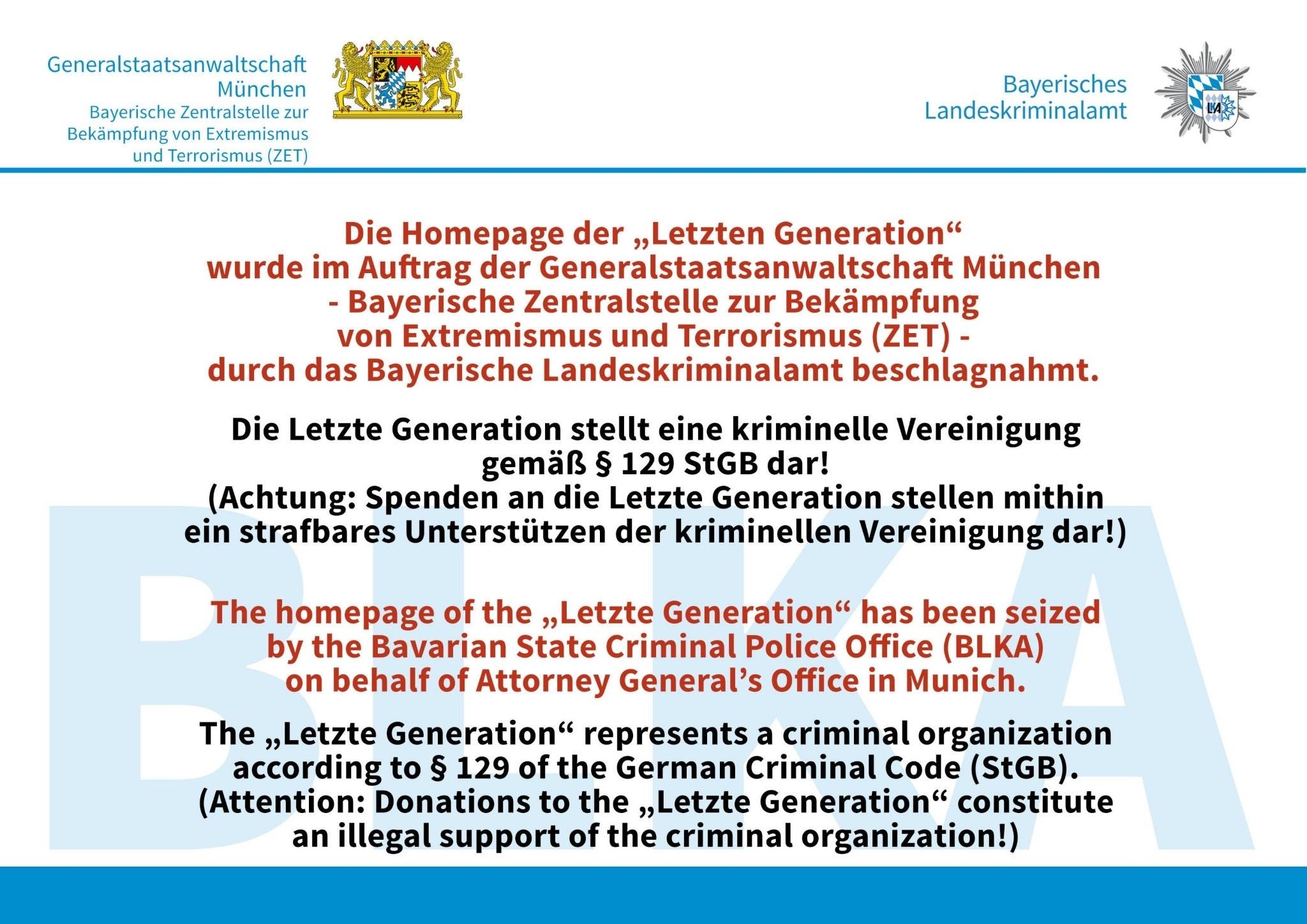
First note from the Munich General Prosecutor's Office, describing the group as 'criminal'. That wording was later removed.

In May 2023, a Bavarian court approved an investigation against the Last Generation because of "suspicion of criminal association". Some 170 police officers conducted raids on flats around Germany, shutting down the group's website, and freezing accounts linked to the group. The investigation was being led by the Bavarian central office for combating extremism and terrorism. The authorities claimed the group was using the website to raise funds for "further criminal acts", stating at least 1.4 million euros had been collected. Two of the group's members were alleged to have planned an attack on an oil pipeline in Bavaria. On 25 June 2023, the Munich public prosecutor's office confirmed that German investigators have been tapping and monitoring several communications from the climate activist group, following revelations in the German press about the case. The police raids ordered in Bavaria were assessed by media as having greatly increased the profile of the group internationally. In September 2024, the German Society for Civil Rights filed a complaint with the Federal Constitutional Court against the secret wiretapping of the press hotline run by Last Generation, arguing that press freedom had been seriously compromised.

In September 2023, a 41-year-old female activist was sentenced to eight months in jail after she was found guilty of coercion, attempted coercion, and resisting law enforcement officers. She had taken part in three street blockades, in two of which she had glued herself to the street. This was the heaviest sentence that members of Last Generation had received to that date.

On 23 April 2024, three climate activists aged between 22 and 64 were handed suspended eight-month prison sentences by a Berlin district court for having spray-painted the Brandenburg Gate in September 2023. Their defence lawyers said that the activists would appeal the verdict.

In July 2024, a female 32-year-old activist was sentenced to 16 months in jail for participation in five street blockades, and spray-painting of the main office of the Federal Ministry for Digital and Transport and an outlet of luxury fashion house Gucci. The verdict was not immediately legally binding. In August 2024, a male 65-year-old activist was sentenced to a 22-month prison term without parole after having been found guilty of coercion, attempted coercion and resisting law enforcement officers. The sentencing covered 40 street blockades, during some of which the defendant had glued himself to the street. Early on in the proceedings, which began in November 2023, the court had made a plea bargain proposal under which a one-year suspended prison sentence was offered to the man in exchange for a confession, but the defence had not agreed to this. In a press release, Last Generation said that the defendant intended to appeal his sentence, which was not immediately legally binding.

On 28 February 2025, the Munich General Prosecutor's Office issued an indictment against five Last Generation organizers, Carla Hinrichs, Christian Bläul, Wolfgang Metzeler-Kick, Imke Bludszuweit, and Ingo Blechschmidt, for allegedly forming a criminal organization under §129 of the German Criminal Code.

For the November 2022 action at Berlin Brandenburg airport, in April 2023 the participating activists were issued a fee notice of slightly over 1,000 euros as a contribution to security enhancements taken by federal police. An appeal by a female activist who had been fined was rejected by an administrative court in March 2025, as was reported in April 2025.

In November 2025, ten of the organization's activists were sentenced by a Hamburg court to pay a compensation of approximately 400,000 euros for a blockade of the city's airport in July 2023 that, according to media reports, had led to the cancellation of 57 flights. The organization had been sued by Eurowings, representing its parent company the Lufthansa Group. The activists were additionally ordered to pay court costs to the amount of approximately 700,000 euros.

In early‑February 2026, five Last Generation activists began their criminal trial at the Potsdam Regional Court for allegedly forming a criminal organization under § 129 of the German Criminal Code.

In March 2026, it became public that Fraport, which operates Frankfurt Airport, had sued eight Last Generation activists for 824,000 euros in damages for their action there on 25 July 2024.

== Funding ==
According to its own statements, the group was mainly financed by donations or crowdfunding. In early 2022 it released a transparency report, according to which in 2021 it had received more than 900,000 euros in donations and spent around 535,000 euros.

In late 2022, the Axel Springer newspaper Welt am Sonntag published a story, according to which Last Generation paid some activists up to 1,300 euros per month. The money is paid out by an organisation called "Wandelbündnis" in Berlin, but originates from the Climate Emergency Fund in the United States.

Last Generation (Germany, Austria, Poland, and Italy) were part of the A22 network funded by the Climate Emergency Fund, together with Renovate Switzerland, Dernière Rénovation in France, Just Stop Oil in the UK (Stopp oljeletinga in Norway), and other groups in Australia, New Zealand, Sweden, and the US.

Additionally, the group received financial backing from Rote Hilfe e.V., an organization considered by the BfV, Germany's federal domestic intelligence agency, a "left-wing extremist" group.

== Controversy ==
Two Last Generation activists did not appear in court in Bad Cannstatt, Baden-Württemberg state in early 2023. They were on trial for blocking a federal highway in late 2022. News reports stated that they had flown to Bali, Indonesia on holiday. However, Last Generation issued a statement pointing out that their members had actually travelled to Thailand and that this had been agreed to by the court. They booked the flights as private individuals, not as activists, the group said. These two things should be treated differently, the statement went on. A court spokesperson denied that the absence had been agreed upon. One of the two activists, a male, was sentenced to two months jail upon his return. In the July 2024 gluing action at Frankfurt airport, a participant said he was that person.

In 2023, an investigation led by Bavaria's central office for combating extremism and terrorism claimed that the group was using its website to raise funds for illicit activities, reportedly collecting over €1.4 million. Two members of the group also faced accusations of planning an attack on an oil pipeline in Bavaria, according to reports by the German newspaper Welt am Sonntag.

Another point of controversy in public discussions has been the group's financial ties to Rote Hilfe. Founded in the 1970s, Rote Hilfe has provided support to imprisoned members of the Red Army Faction (RAF), a far-left terrorist group active in West Germany, with some members of RH ultimately going as far as joining RAF or similar groups.

== Reception ==
Media observers saw in mid-2023 the crossing of red lines during the actions of Last Generation as a strategy to draw attention.

By mid-2023, the term Klimakleber (climate gluers) for members of Last Generation had become increasingly used by the German public and the media, with opinions differing about whether it was pejorative. The term was also seen by some media as having ridiculing connotations.

In 2022, the Association for the German Language chose "Climate-terrorist" as Un-word of the year 2022. The expression was used in public discourse to discredit activists and their protests for more climate protection, the jury justified their choice. Some politicians spoke about a "Climate-RAF" or "Green RAF", the acronym referring to German post-war terrorist group Red Army Faction. The term originated in a December 2021 interview, in which climate activist Tadzio Müller warned that blocking climate action might result in a militant "Green RAF". In a December 2022 interview, Müller, who is not himself part of the Last Generation, expressed his regret about his use of the term.

== Disestablishment in 2025 ==
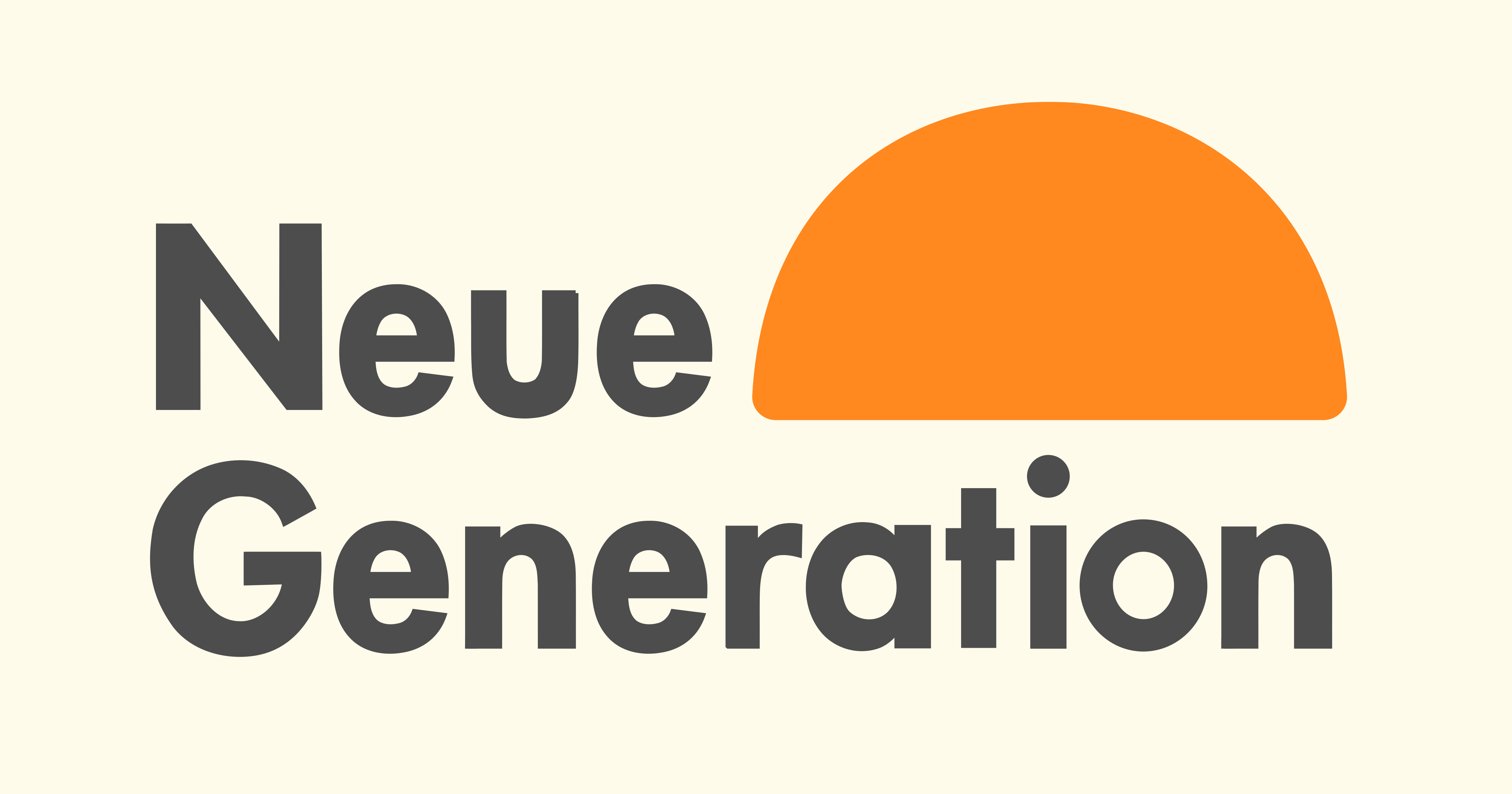
Neue Generation logo

Last Generation announced its disestablishment in late‑February 2025 and its intention for form two new groups: Neue Generation and Widerstandskollektiv. This decision parallels similar moves by Just Stop Oil in the United Kingdom.

== See also ==
- Just Stop Oil, a United Kingdom environmental organisation using civil disobedience
- Starve until you are honest climate hunger strike – a climate hunger strike which took place in Berlin in mid‑2024
- Shaking up Parliament – Voice of the Last Generation
