= Elizabeth Ngugi =

Nurse and public health researcher

- Died: March or April 2015
- Education: Columbia Pacific University
- Scientific career
- Workplaces: Kenyatta National Hospital, University of Nairobi, University of Manitoba

Elizabeth Ngugi (died 2015) was a Kenyan professor of community health at the University of Nairobi, and a nurse by training and profession. Her major contributions to her university's program was her research and work with local prostitutes to prevent HIV/AIDS transmission. Ngugi is described as the first Kenyan nurse to become a professor.

== Early career and education ==
Ngugi started nursing at the Kenyatta National Hospital in 1960, as the Sister in Charge of paediatric health. In 1979 she was promoted to deputy chief nursing officer at the Ministry of Health. In 1981, while still practicing as a nurse, Ngugi presented a paper about the emerging, new role of nurses in the Kenyan health system. She emphasized that the role of a nurse is not only caring for the patient, but engaging with and caring for the patient's family members as well. Ngugi studied at Columbia Pacific University for her BA and Masters in Nursing Administration from 1983 to 1985, and earned a PhD in social work in 1989. In 1986 she became a lecturer in the University of Nairobi, School of Public Health and was eventually promoted to the position of Kenyan national AIDS coordinator.

== Work against HIV/AIDS ==
Ngugi was involved in an international collaboration in Nairobi to engage with sex workers and help them to tackle sexually transmitted diseases. She joined in 1984 as a nurse, and made efforts to reach out to sex workers instead of stigmatising them. Much of Ngugi's research focused on these vulnerable communities, and she provided them with medical care, advice and free condoms in return for participation. She was involved in research that studied the efficacy of a contraceptive sponge in preventing new HIV infections about Nairobi sex workers. The study found no evidence in the effectiveness of the contraceptive sponge in reducing infections. By helping the sex workers to collectively demand condom use from their clients, their utilisation has soared from 4% to 90%, even though men often offer more money for unprotected sex. Her empowering approach has been praised by public health experts.

In 1984, Ngugi in collaboration with Frank Plummer from the University of Manitoba, helped establish the Majengo Clinic in Majengo, Kenya. The clinic has gone on to serve as a site for a multitude of HIV/AIDS research and as a site for sex workers to receive treatment and prevention services for sexually transmitted diseases. Through this clinic, Ngugi worked in the forefront of treating sexually transmitted diseases like gonorrhea and chlamydia. Ngugi and Plummer published a study indicating levels of long-lived HIV resistance among Kenyan sex workers who work in Majengo. Ngugi decried the fact that these women contribute so much to research but are still living in poverty and must sell their bodies to survive.

In 1991 she became director of the collaborative HIV/AIDS effort with the University of Manitoba, a role she held until 2006. Ngugi was promoted to Associate Professor of Community Health Sciences at the University of Manitoba in her final year of directorship. In 1992 Ngugi established HerStory (initially as the Kenya Voluntary Women Rehabilitation Centre) to support sex workers to escape prostitution with training, support and microfinance. Now HerStory also looks after AIDS orphans.

In 1992, Ngugi with Peter Piot, Jonathan Mann, Bila M. Kapita, Robert Colebunders co-authored AIDS in Africa: a manual for physicians and published it through WHO for the purpose of aiding physicians in diagnosis and treatment of HIV/AIDS. The manual also served as an educational material for physicians on what should be expected and on the possible transmission methods of HIV.

Ngugi established the University of Nairobi Centre of HIV Prevention and Research in 2006. She also led the implementation of government efforts against HIV/AIDS including the building of ten drop-in centres for vulnerable populations in northern and eastern Kenya.

== Awards ==
For her contributions to public health in Kenya Ngugi has been awarded many accolades, including:

- 2004 UN Kenyan of the Year.
- 2004–05 Order of the Golden Warrior Presidential Award.

== Personal life ==
Ngugi has a son who practises law in Nairobi.
