= Project SIDA =

AIDS research project

Project SIDA (1984–1991), or Projet SIDA ("Project AIDS" in French), was a joint scientific project between Zaire, the United States, and Belgium to study AIDS in Central Africa. Headquartered in Kinshasa, Zaire (DRC), Projet SIDA was designed as a collaboration between foreign scientists with experience studying epidemics and local scientists and physicians familiar with the local culture and customs. Initiated in 1984, Project SIDA began under the direction of Jonathan Mann with funding from the U.S. and Belgium, as well as support from the Zairian government. Project SIDA was based at Mama Yemo (Kinshasa General) hospital in Kinshasa.

Early on, Projet SIDA researchers confirmed the presence of AIDS outside of the United States through laboratory testing of blood samples collected by Bila Kapita. Unlike in the United States, where most identified AIDS cases were male, Projet SIDA identified an equal number of male and female AIDS patients at Mama Yemo. Thus, the project was one of the first to establish the heterosexual transmission of AIDS.

Project SIDA was terminated in 1991 due to civil war in Zaire.

== Background ==
Dr. Bila Kapita was the first to notice the beginnings of the AIDS epidemic in Zaire. At the time, AIDS was associated almost exclusively with male populations in Europe and North America. In the 1970s a condition referred to as "slim" or "wasting disease" appeared in Central and Eastern Africa. In 1975 Kapita, a cardiologist and at that time the head of internal medicine at Mama Yemo, observed an increased number of these patients with Kaposi's sarcoma, a rare type of tumor linked to AIDS. Meanwhile, doctors in the U.S. and in Western Europe began to notice heterosexual patients with similar travel histories to and from Central Africa suffering from Pneumocystis carinii, a type of pneumonia also found in homosexual North American AIDS patients. Thomas Quinn of National Institute of Allergies and Infectious Diseases, Joseph McCormick of the Centers for Disease Control, and Peter Piot of the Institute of Tropical Medicine in Antwerp went on a fact-finding mission Kinshasa in the summer of 1983 at the request of Kalisa Ruti, the Zaire Minister of Health

In Kinshasa, Kapita introduced Quinn, McCormick, and Piot to 38 patients in Kinshasa and provided samples he had collected of their blood. Many of these patients displayed cryptococcal meningitis, which is often linked to AIDS. Kaptita, McCormick, and Piot, as well as Sheila Mitchell of the CDC, identified the loss of T cells in Kapita's patients. The initial 1983 work done in Mama Yemo, along with research done by Belgian physician Nathan Clumeck in Kigali, Rwanda and cell counts of blood collected in Rwanda by the Pasteur Institute, established the connection between North American AIDS and the disease present in Central Africa.

=== Project Initiators ===
In 1983 Piot and Quinn were in talks to create a joint project between the Institute of Tropical Medicine (ITM) in Antwerp, Belgium, the National Institute of Allergy and Infectious Diseases (NIAID) at the National Institute of Health (NIH) in Washington, D.C., and Mama Yemo. Dr. Jean-Jacques Muyembe of the University of Kinshasa also joined the project upon the condition that the university would receive funding and a number of guaranteed publications from the research. Because the Center for Disease Control (CDC) in Atlanta, Georgia was planning an AIDS research project at the same time, the US government merged the NIAID and CDC plans. In March 1984, James Curran, director of the CDC AIDS program, brought CDC epidemiologist Jonathan Mann on as Projet SIDA's first director. Mann arrived in Kinshasa in June, 1984. On August 29, 1984, Projet SIDA officially opened its lab offices at Mama Yemo Hospital with an official ceremony including Zairian animateurs.

Two teams operated out of Kinshasa: a clinical staff and immunological lab. Clinical research was conducted with the support of the ITM and included a lab headed by Flemish epidemiologist Frieda Behets, and Zairian epidemiologists Bosenge Ngali and Eugene Nzila Nzilambi. Robert "Bob" Colebunders also came to provide support for Kapita's primary care services at Mama Yemo. NIAID epidemiologist Henry "Skip" Francis arrived in September 1984 to set up labs at Mama Yemo. Francis's team included Kalisa Ruti and focused primarily on virological and immunological studies of the serum of Kapita's collected blood samples.

=== Funding and Support ===
At Project SIDA's conception, the CDC contributed $2.5 million, NIAID $1 million, and $.5 million from the Institute of Tropical Medicine. Project SIDA initially employed 7 staff members, but later contained more than 300 physicians, researchers, and assistants only seven of whom were expatriates. Funding provided research materials, such as twenty Landcruisers and equipment for running blood tests, as well as funding for Zairian researchers to pursue degrees in the U.S. and Europe. Project SIDA began operating with $300,000 per year, reaching a peak annual budget of $4 million before the US pulled funding in 1991.

==== Relationship with Zairian Government ====
Because Zairians able to travel abroad for medical services, such as those who saw Piot in the mid-1970s in Antwerp, were often wealthier citizens from Kinshasa, the Zairian government was aware of potential AIDS cases early on. The CDC's involvement in containing Zaire's 1976–1977 Ebola outbreak had earned the agency a degree of confidence within Zairian government, and thus became a natural partner for this new AIDS crisis. All of Project SIDA's findings were published in strict coordination with the government of Zaire, then under president Mobutu Sese Seko. Although Project SIDA often sent blood samples from Zaire to the NIH labs in Washington, DC, all tests on these samples had to first be authorized by the Zairian government. When drawing blood from samples, per the Zairian government's stipulations and Mann's support, Project SIDA researchers informed patients that the samples would be used in a study for malaria, rather than AIDS. Likewise, Project SIDA was not allowed to publish statistics on HIV prevalence. After Kapita presented research at the 1986 Paris International AIDS Conference, the Zairian government threatened the doctor with arrest for revealing information about the country's HIV prevalence. At the same time, the Zairian government based their support of Project SIDA upon the expectation that the collaboration would offer training for medical staff in Kinshasa. By the late 1980s the Zairian National AIDS Program had adopted a number of recommendations for public health campaigns based on Project SIDA's research.

== Operations ==
=== 1984-1986 ===
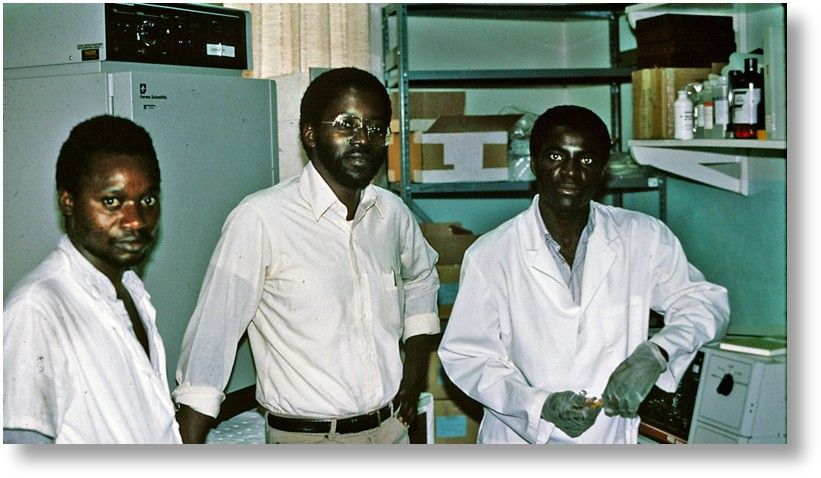
Photograph taken at the Project SIDA Laboratory, 1985. From left to right: Unknown SIDA researcher, Skip Francis, Michel Lubaki Ndogola

Project SIDA officially opened its doors on August 29, 1984. Under Mann's leadership, Project SIDA remained a small operation of only 7 employees. At this time, the project had a budget of $300,000 per year and focused their work on the Mama Yemo Hospital itself. Project SIDA had three main objectives upon its conception: to identify risk factors of HIV transmission, to identify modes of transmission of HIV, and to generate hypotheses for future research. After equipping Mama Yemo to do serological surveys and anticipating that HIV tests would soon become available, Project SIDA collected samples from 2500 Mama Yemo Hospital personnel and 800 University of Kinshasa staff. This local surveillance of health care workers, but not the population at large, responded to Zairian concerns about transmission of HIV in hospital settings.

In July 1984 Project SIDA's preliminary findings from the 1983 Mama Yemo study of Kapita's blood samples were published in the scientific journal The Lancet. This article marked the first major publication from the project and included Piot, Kapita, Henri Taelman, K. Ndangi, Kayembe Kalambayi, Chris Bridts, Thomas Quinn, Fred Feinsod, Odio Wobin, P. Mazebo, Wim Stevens, Sheila Mitchell, and Joseph McCormick as contributors. The article demonstrated the transmission of AIDS between heterosexual partners. Before finding an audience at The Lancet, the New England Journal of Medicine rejected the findings on the grounds that heterosexual transmission could not possibly exist. The 1984 article was nevertheless one of the earliest and most important studies to come out of Zaire.

In April 1985 Project SIDA members Kapita, Nzila Nzilambi, Mann, and Piot along with Dr. Pangu Kaza Asila of the Zairian Ministry of Health and Dr. Wobin Odio of the University of Kinshasa, attended the First International Conference on AIDS in Atlanta. While there American scientists made racist links between African sexuality and HIV transmission that not only shocked the conference's only African participants—Kapita, Nzila Nzilambi, Asila, and Odio—but also politicians across the continent. Not long after WHO's Dr. Falhry Assad and Mann organized the 1985 WHO Workshop on AIDS in Africa in Bangui, Central African Republic with the intention of focusing discussions on the African context. The Bangui conference established a clinical definition of AIDS, partially through the findings of Project SIDA in Zaire.

=== 1986–1990 ===
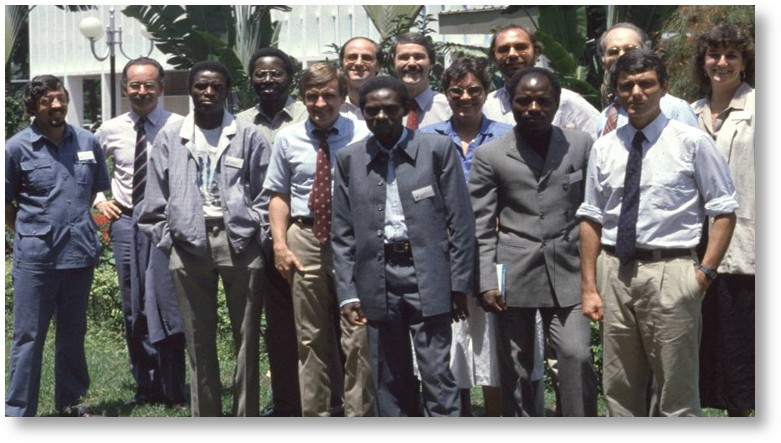
Image of Project SIDA researchers. From left to right: Joe McCormick, Jon Mann, Nzila Nzilambi, Skip Francis, Jim Curran, Bob Colebunders, Bila Capita, Tom Quinn, Ann Nelson, Peter Piot, Bosenge Ngaly, John LaMontagne, Robin Ryder, Stephanie Sagabiel

In September 1986 Mann left Project SIDA to become the director of the new WHO Global Programme on AIDS. Robin Ryder, a former infectious disease specialist at the CDC and a former pediatrician, became the project's director following Mann's departure. At the time, Project SIDA was not conducting surveillance of HIV incidence nor conducting large population studies. Under Ryder, Project SIDA expanded its employee from 7 to 300 people and began a number of local initiatives. Namely, Project SIDA set up and funded testing in Kinshasa's blood banks. With the help of the German Technical Cooperation Agency (GTZ), Project SIDA organized sera labs that would allow rapid testing of donations before blood transfusions, which had previously accounted for 1000 cases of HIV per year. During this period, Project SIDA also established a clinic for sex workers in Kinshasa's entertainment district, Matonge. Project SIDA discovered that 26 percent of Matonge participants were HIV positive and provided counseling, condoms, and STI treatment in the community. Under Ryder's directorship, Project SIDA also launched a study on mother-to-child HIV infection.

=== 1990–1993 ===
In 1990, Robin Ryder left Project SIDA and William Heyward of the CDC took over as director. In 1990 the CDC also began pulling financial support from Project SIDA due to growing political unrest in Zaire. That year the E.U. and Belgium began economic sanctions again Zaire following protests and killings at the University of Lubumbashi. After a soldiers' mutiny in 1991, the U.S. ended all research and aid programs in Zaire, and all Belgian and American Project SIDA workers were pulled from the country. In 1991, Eugene Nzila Nzilambi took over as director of Project SIDA, which was still receiving limited funds from Doctors Without Borders and the Belgian government. (Nzila Nzilambi received only $5 per month as a salary during this period.) In 1992, Henry "Skip" Francis returned to Zaire to retrieve lab equipment, and the project officially ended in 1993. A number of Project SIDA ventures were abandoned without official staff. Most notably, testing of blood donations in Kinshasa and Lubumbashi ceased. Blood samples collected by Project SIDA, saved during political unrest by staff member Delfi Messinger, remained at the National Institute of Biomedical Research in Kinshasa under the supervision of institute director Kankienza Muana'mbo.

== Research ==
The researchers involved in Projet SIDA envisioned the project as an antidote to the typical "safari research" done by uninvolved Western scientists. During the mid to late-1980s, many U.S. and European projects were concerned with proving that HIV-1, which had only been isolated and proven to be associated with AIDS in the summer of 1983, could be transmitted through heterosexual intercourse. Unlike other North American projects, Projet SIDA did not intend to prove the heterosexual transmission of AIDS, but rather identify how AIDS spread within a Central African context. The project's early studies responded to local concerns of prevalence among Mama Yemo Hospital staff, identifying risk groups within Kinshasa, and examining household transmission.

=== Scientific Discoveries ===
Project SIDA generated more than a thousand scientific abstracts and 120 publications. Project SIDA directors attempted to prioritize Zairian lead researchers and publications.

Most notably, Project SIDA was the first research group to identify heterosexual transmission of AIDS and the existence of AIDS outside of the Global North. Project SIDA also identified a HIV prevalence of 6–7% of expectant mothers at Mama Yemo while working with the hospital's antenatal clinic. The project also established a prevalence of 7–8% of the larger Kinshasa population. Studies also established the various modes of transmission of HIV in Zaire: mother-to-child, parental (from blood infusions), and sexual intercourse. Lastly, Project SIDA research headed by Bob Colebunders established a connection between tuberculosis and AIDS cases. This study also demonstrated that existing treatments for tuberculosis at Mama Yemo were not effective with HIV positive patients. At the time, tuberculosis was the leading cause of death for AIDS patients.

=== Public Health Interventions ===
Under the direction of Robin Ryder, Project SIDA developed a number of community-focused projects. The first of these was a clinic in Matonge, a hub for sex work in Kinshasa, which provided condoms, STI treatment, and counseling for HIV positive participants. This project also drew samples for a seroprevalence study. During the course of this project (roughly 1986–1990), prevalence of HIV among Matonge sex workers fell—largely due to deaths of study participants—but so did the incidence of infection of HIV in the community. Under Ryder, Project SIDA also initiated a study of mother-to-child transmission in Mama Yemo's antenatal clinic. While measuring positivity rates, Project SIDA took over the healthcare of more than 12,000 mothers. Project SIDA staff, most notably Kapita and Piot, initiated the use of rapid tests to screen blood at blood banks in Kinshasa and Lubumbashi. Finally, Project SIDA was linked with the Zairian government's efforts to produce and distribute Prudence condoms. This initiative began with former Project SIDA staff Bosenge Ngali, the director of the Zairian National AIDS Programme (the first of its kind in Africa).

== Legacy ==
Project SIDA shuttered in 1991–1993 due to the beginnings of civil unrest and the end of Mobutu's authoritarian government. Before the project ended, HIV prevalence in Kinshasa stabilized at 4-8%, but quickly rose to 10% by 1992, after Project SIDA had all but ceased operations. However, infection prevalence was down to 4–6% by 1998. A number of former Project SIDA staff coordinated with their colleagues to sponsor Zairian staff's move to the US. Examples include Claudes Kamenga, an epidemiologist with Project SIDA for five years before joining Family Health International in Arlington, Virginia. A number of Zairian staff continued working in what is now known as the DRC, although notably Nzilambi remained in Zaire, at the Project SIDA labs until at least 1997.

=== Critiques of Project SIDA ===
By 1987 a number of Zairian Project SIDA staff had waged critiques of the project's focus. Generally, Zairian staff felt that the project focused too intensely on documenting AIDS in Zaire without attending to AIDS prevention. Bila Kapita felt that Project SIDA had invested too much money in epidemiological research, leaving little in the budget for the treatment of Mama Yemo AIDS patients and prevention in the larger community. Kapita also noted that the funds for securing Kinshasa's blood bank had not come from the US or Belgium. Instead Piot and Kapita had been forced to find outside funding from Germany. By the end of Project SIDA's operations, much of the larger Zairian population began to associate the AIDS crisis with the excessive spending of Mobutu's economic policies, despite Project SIDA's efforts and the Zairian government's public health interventions, such as the production and distribution of condoms.
