= Eugene Nzila Nzilambi =

Zairean scientist and physician

Eugene Nzila Nzilambi, also referred to as N. Nzila, Nzila Nzilambi, or Eugene Nzila, is a Zairean scientist and physician at the Department of Public Health in Kinshasa, now known as the Ministry of Public Health (Democratic Republic of the Congo). He played at important role in establishing Project SIDA in Zaire, along with several international scientists. While conducting research, he opened a walk-in clinic and has since produced a lot of research on the HIV virus.

== Background ==
Nzilambi is a Zairean scientist, working mainly in Kinshasa and Zaire. Nzilambi received his education at the Johns Hopkins School of Medicine in Baltimore, and was later affiliated with the University of Kinshasa. During the late 1990s and 1980s, he focused his research in epidemiology at the Mama Yemo Hospital, now known as Kinshasa General Hospital.

== Career ==
=== Early work ===
He was the leader on many different research projects, specifically focusing on the HIV/AIDS epidemic, working with several international scientists.

Nzilambi, as well as other researchers, such as Joseph B. McCormick and Jonathan Mann, helped guide the establishment of Project SIDA in Kinshasa. He was one of the whole African scientists in many of his publications, others being Dr. Bosenga N'Galy and Dr. Pangu Kasa Azila. The team focused on the prevalence of HIV and the risk factors that existed specifically in the area. A well-known study, with McCormick and Kevin De Cock, consisted of Nzilambi guiding the team in a ten year study, testing blood samples taken in 1976 and 1985. The study mainly established the presence of HIV in rural areas for a period of time, as well as the social issues that may have led to the epidemic.

In the late 1980s most of his publications focused on HIV being present in groups of people, including pediatric patients and female prostitutes in Zaire. As a physician in the 1990s, Nzilambi began a walk-in clinic for Zairean prostitutes in order to help and educate them about HIV. He studied the results of their tests, while offering support and care for their health. Later, Nzilambi, along with researchers like Bila M. Kapita and Peter Piot, attended an international conference in Atlanta.

=== Post-Project SIDA work ===
After Project SIDA dismantled in 1991, Dr. Nzilambi continued his research. Much of it focused on the disease itself, rather than its prevalence in the communities of Zaire. In the late 1990s, it was discovered that Dr. Nzilambi had moved to the United States and was identifying groups of individuals that were not affected by the disease.

His most recent work has been dated to the early 2000s. These publications revolve around vaccine and intervention efforts, as well as subtypes of the virus.

== Publications ==
- Surveillance for AIDS in a Central African city, Kinshasa, Zaire
- The Prevalence of Infection with Human Immunodeficiency Virus over a 10-Year Period in Rural Zaire
- Surveillance for AIDS in a Central African city, Kinshasa, Zaire
