= Robert Colebunders =

Belgian infectious disease physician

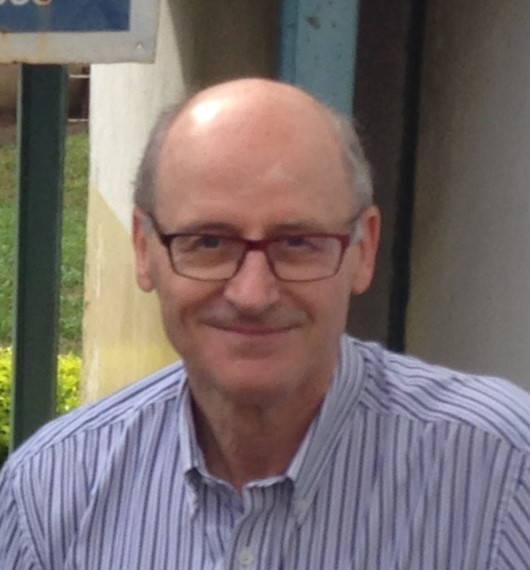
- Colebunders at the Mahenge Clinic, Tanzania
- Born: 19 April 1949 (age 77)
- Education: University of Antwerp; Free University of Brussels; Institute of Tropical Medicine Antwerp
- Scientific career
- Fields: Infectious diseases
- Workplaces: Global Health Institute; University of Antwerp; Institute of Tropical Medicine Antwerp
- Website: uantwerpen.be/en/staff/robert-colebunders/my-website/

Robert Colebunders (born 19 April 1949) is a Belgian clinician and researcher specialising in infectious diseases and epidemiology, particularly in the study and management of emerging pathogens and tropical diseases including Ebola, AIDS, tuberculosis and onchocerciasis. Colebunders investigated major outbreaks, such as the Ebola and Marburg virus epidemics, and has contributed to research on COVID-19 and monkeypox. His current work focuses on onchocerciasis-associated epilepsy (OAE), a condition prevalent in regions where river blindness (onchocerciasis) is endemic. He is professor emeritus at the Institute of Tropical Medicine Antwerp (ITM), Belgium, and continues to lead international research efforts on infectious diseases at the Global Health Institute.

== Early life and education ==
After completing his early education in Flanders, Belgium, Colebunders pursued a medical degree at the Vrije Universiteit Brussel, graduating in 1973. He subsequently completed a residency in internal medicine at St. Pierre University Hospital in Brussels, specialising in tropical diseases. His interest for addressing infectious diseases, particularly in resource-limited settings, led him to pursue further specialisation, earning a PhD from the University of Antwerp.

== Career ==
After completing his medical studies, Colebunders spent his early career as a general practitioner in Bougaa, Algeria, from 1974 to 1975, where he gained experience treating patients in rural, resource-constrained environments. During the 1980s, Colebunders', alongside Peter Piot, contributed significantly to the understanding of HIV/AIDS in Africa. Their work helped define the clinical manifestations of HIV infection and led to the development of affordable diagnostic tests, which were crucial for diagnosing HIV in resource-limited settings. Between 1985 and 1988, Colebunders coordinated clinical studies on HIV/AIDS as part of "Projet SIDA" in Kinshasa, in what is now the Democratic Republic of the Congo. He was one of the first physicians to study and describe the clinical manifestations of HIV in Africa, producing foundational research that shaped understanding of the disease on the continent. Together with Dr Jonathan Mann (lead epidemiologist), Henry "Skip" Francis (responsible for the laboratory) and two Zairian physicians, Dr Eugene Nzila Nzilambi and Dr Bosenga Ngali, the group produced more than a hundred publications addressing fundamental questions about AIDS in Africa.

Colebunders furthered his research in this area as a visiting scientist at the Centers for Disease Control (CDC) International Activities HIV/AIDS programme in Atlanta, USA, in 1988. In the mid-1990s, he participated in international teams that investigated and controlled two major hemorrhagic fever outbreaks in the Democratic Republic of the Congo. He contributed to managing the 1995 Kikwit Ebola outbreak and the 1999 Marburg virus outbreak in Durba. His clinical documentation during these outbreaks provided key insights into the symptoms and treatment protocols for hemorrhagic fevers in low-resource settings.He also reviewed in Conakry, the clinical care activities of Doctors Without Borders during the West African Ebola outbreak.

In 2004, he took a sabbatical to serve as a senior clinical investigator at the Infectious Diseases Institute in Kampala, Uganda, assisting with the rollout of antiretroviral therapy (ART) for HIV patients. Upon returning to ITM in 2005, he led the clinical HIV/STD Unit in the Department of Clinical Sciences until 2014. His efforts contributed to improving access to life-saving treatment in Uganda and surrounding regions. In 2008, he received a European and Developing Countries Clinical Trials Partnership (EDCTP) network grant in 2008 to produce a workshop on tuberculosis immune reconstitution inflammatory syndrome (TB IRIS), linking this syndrome to his ongoing research on HIV.

In addition to his HIV/AIDS work, Colebunders coordinated a significant institutional collaboration between Flemish universities and the University of Limpopo in South Africa. This partnership, part of the VLIR-IUC (Flemish Inter-universities Council -Institutional University Cooperation) programme, aimed to strengthen research capacity and address healthcare challenges, including infectious diseases like HIV, in rural African communities. His dedication to this field has been further evidenced by grants awarded, including a HORIZON grant (2015–2020) and a Research Foundation – Flanders (FWO) senior research project (2022), supporting his research on onchocerciasis-associated epilepsy and other infectious diseases. He is also a strong advocate for open access and networking in science, highlighting the challenges faced by scientists in resource-limited settings.

In 2014, Colebunders received an advanced European Research Council (ERC) grant to investigate the cause of nodding syndrome and other forms of epilepsy in onchocerciasis-endemic regions. Through his research, he discovered that nodding syndrome is one of the phenotypic presentations of onchocerciasis-associated epilepsy (OAE). His studies showed that strengthening onchocerciasis elimination programs can prevent new epilepsy cases (23). His team detected a novel rhabdovirus (OVRV1) in O. volvulus worms, currently under investigation as a possible co-factor in the pathogenesis of OAE. Since 2025 he co-coordinates an Mpox EDCTP project in South Kivu. He has authored over 800 peer-reviewed papers and contributed to 40 book chapters. He was involved in many capacity building projects in Africa and mentored 61 PhD students.
