= Gianluca Grimalda =

Italian researcher (born 1971)

- Born: 30 December 1971 (age 54); Milan, Italy
- Education: Bocconi University, University of Southampton, University of Pavia
- Occupations: Researcher, climatologist, economist

Gianluca Grimalda (born 30 December 1971) is an Italian social scientist. Concerned about the effects of climate change and social cohesion, he came to public attention when he refused to travel by plane on business because of the climate impact of air travel. This refusal was followed by dismissal by his employer, the Kiel Institute for the World Economy (IfW Kiel).

== Early life and career ==
Born in Milan on 30 December 1971, Grimalda obtained a degree in economics from Bocconi University and doctorates from the University of Pavia and the University of Southampton in 2003. He worked as a researcher at the Kiel Institute for the World Economy until his dismissal in October 2023. From January to June 2024, Grimalda was a visiting professor at the University of Passau. Grimalda's research focuses on social cohesion and how societies adapt to macro-factors of change such as global warming and globalization. His field research took him to Bougainville, Papua New Guinea, where he studied people's willingness to help each other in degraded conditions caused by climate change.

== Commitment to climate protection ==
Grimalda has actively participated in protest actions, notably as part of Scientist Rebellion, and has campaigned for civil disobedience as a means of promoting climate protection. Among other things, in October 2022 he and other scientists glued themselves to the floor for forty hours in the pavilion of the Porsche museum in Wolfsburg, this Volkswagen owned location is targeted to echo the Dieselgate. In November of the same year, the researcher also took part in an international blockade of private jets airports.

Grimalda always travels avoiding the use of aircraft in favour of more climate friendly means of transport such as boats, trains and buses. This attitude reflects his convictions on the ethics of aviation in the face of the climate crisis and indirectly led to his being ousted from his post at the Institute for World Economics in Kiel. Field research in Papua New Guinea had been extended due to unforeseen circumstances, so the institute had asked him to return within ten days or face dismissal. His return journey took 35 days due to renouncing air travel. Nine thousand scientists from all over Europe signed a petition calling for him to remain at the Institute for World Economics. An initial action against his dismissal was brought before the Kiel Labour Court, but was unsuccessful. Subsequently, on 10 January 2025, the Kiel Labour Court handed down its verdict: the institute would compensate the researcher, but would not re-employ him, on the grounds of "incompatibility of the parties' ideological convictions". He said he "would have liked my job back, but this is already a first step in the legal recognition of conscientious objection on climate grounds", and added that half of his compensation would go towards climate change mitigation efforts.

== Employment law ==
He is known as the first employee to be dismissed and then compensated, in connection with the fight against climate change.

== Documentary ==
In June 2024, Paolo Casalis's documentary The Researcher premiered at the Cinemambiente Festival. It depicts Grimalda's journey to Papua New Guinea in 2023: at the end of his research work, Grimalda is dismissed for refusing to take a plane. As he begins the journey home, his story and his application of ‘slow travel’ become known and viral on social networks. The film won the Award for Best Educational Work at the Frome Climate Film Festival (UK) in May 2025.

== Book ==
Grimalda wrote a book about his story, published in June 2025 in Italian by the publishing house Feltrinelli. The book, titled A fuoco (which can be translated as either "Burning up" or "Zooming in") is the diary of the 72 days/28,000 km no-fly journey from Bougainville to Germany. Grimalda intertwines the chronicle of his journey with the testimonies of people he met in their struggle to adapt to climate change. The book also offers scientific information on the ecosystem stability of some of the places he travelled through.

== Publications ==
- with Alexis Belianin, Heike Hennig-Schmidt, Till Requate, and Marina V. Ryzhkova (2022), "Sanctions and international interaction improve cooperation to avert climate change", Proceedings of the Royal Society B, vol. 289, no. 1972, The Royal Society, p. 20212174, doi:10.1098/rspb.2021.2174
- with Andreas Pondorfer and David P. Tracer (2016), "Social image concerns promote cooperation more than altruistic punishment", Nature Communications, vol. 7, Springer Nature, p. 12288, doi:10.1038/ncomms12288
- with Nancy R. Buchan, Rick Wilson, Marilynn Brewer, Enrique Fatas, and Margaret Foddy (2009), "Globalization and human cooperation", Proceedings of the National Academy of Sciences, vol. 106, US National Academy of Sciences, pp. 4138--4142, doi:10.1073/pnas.080952210
- with Anirban Kar, Eugenio Proto (2015), "Procedural fairness in lotteries assigning initial roles in a dynamic setting" (PDF), Experimental Economics (Bd. 19, 12.11.2015, Nr. 4, Date:12.2016: 819-841), vol. 19, no. 4, SpringerLink, pp. 819–841, doi:10.1007/s10683-015-9469-5, URN: nbn:de:1111-2016121110558
- with Fabrice Murtin, David Pipke, Louis G. Putterman, Matthias Sutter (2023), The politicized pandemic: Ideological polarization and the behavioral response to COVID-19, vol. 156, European Economic Review, p. 104472, doi:10.1016/j.euroecorev.2023.104472.
- with Marilynn Brewer, Nancy R. Buchan, Adriana Pinate, Giulia Urso (2021), "Exposure to COVID-19 is associated with increased altruism, particularly at the local level", Nature Scientific Reports, vol. 11, no. 18950, Heidelberg, Berlin: Springer, p. 18950, Bibcode:2021NatSR..1118950G, doi:10.1038/s41598-021-97234-2, hdl:10419/248645, ISSN 2045-2322, PMC 8460816, PMID 34556687, URN: nbn:de:101:1-2022011302171084990490.
