= Scientist Rebellion =

International scientists' environmentalist group

- Type: NGO
- Purpose: Climate crisis awareness
- Website: scientistrebellion.org
- Remarks: Front‑line participation is limited to scientists, scholars, and academics

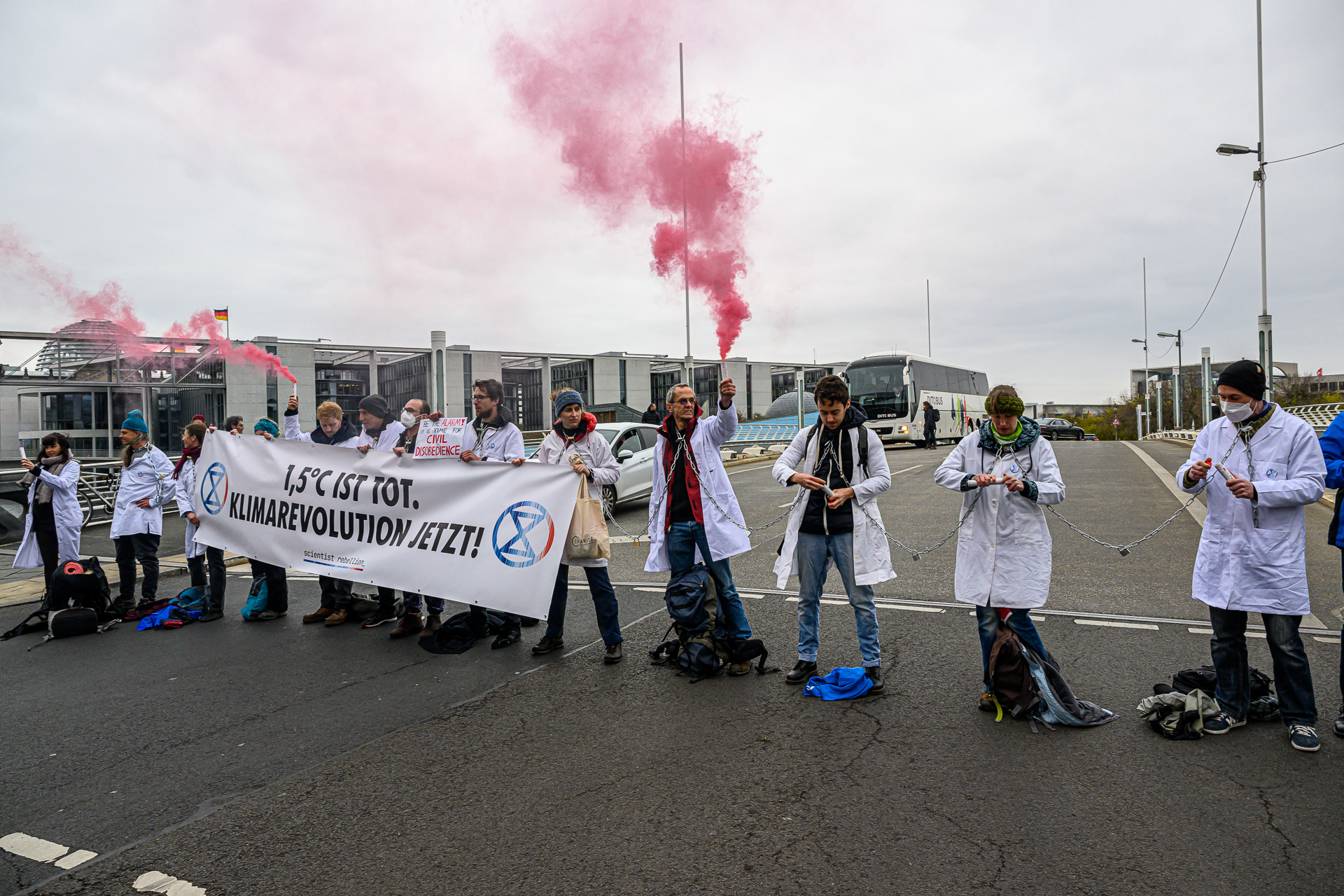
Scientist Rebellion blocks the Kronprinzenbrücke in Berlin in 2022 to highlight warnings in the IPCC Sixth Assessment Report. The banner reads: "1.5°C is dead. Climate revolution now!".

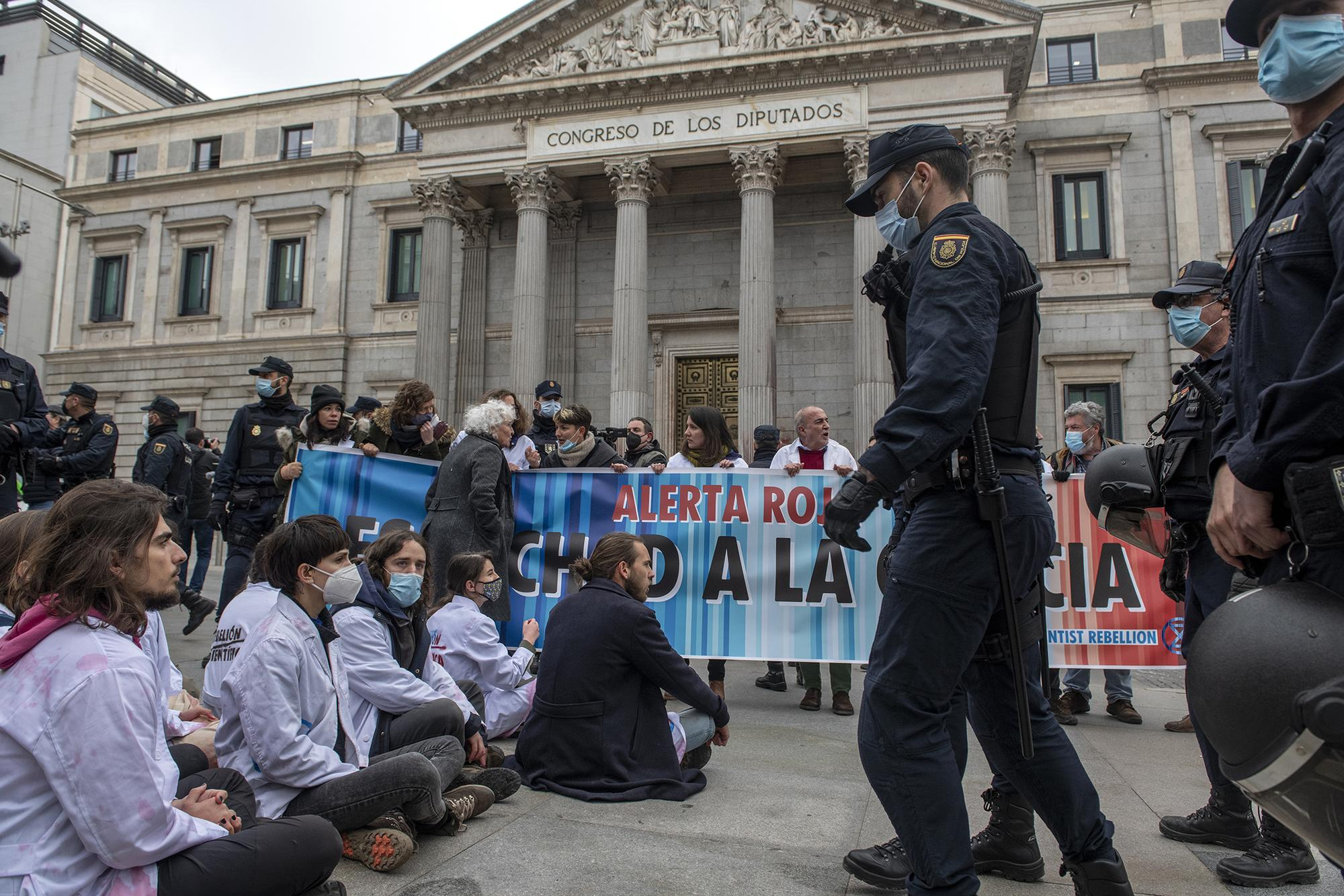
Protest action outside the Congreso de los Diputados in Madrid in 2022

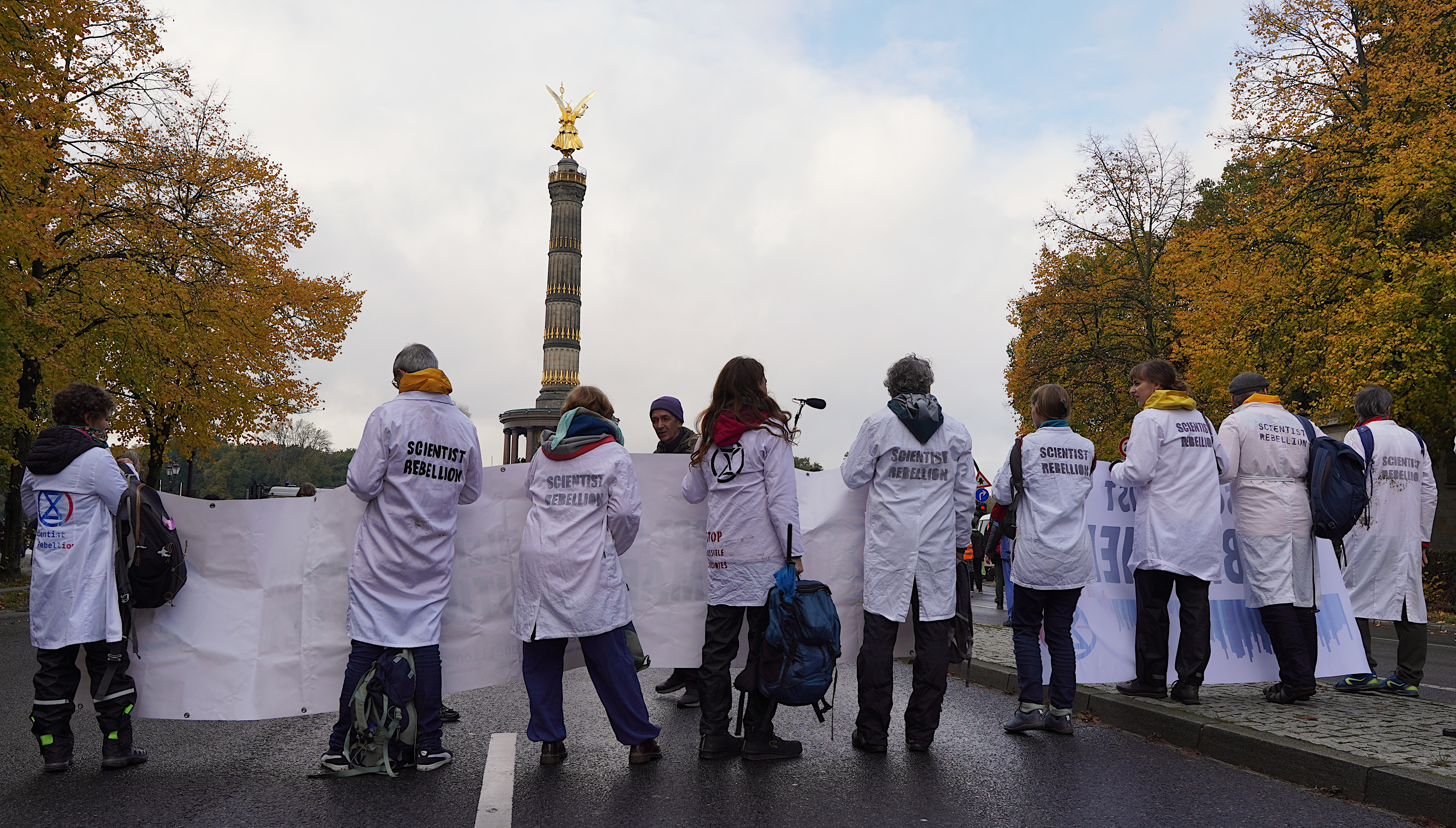
Members of Scientist Rebellion from behind at the Last Generation Massenblockade Berlin on 28 October 2023

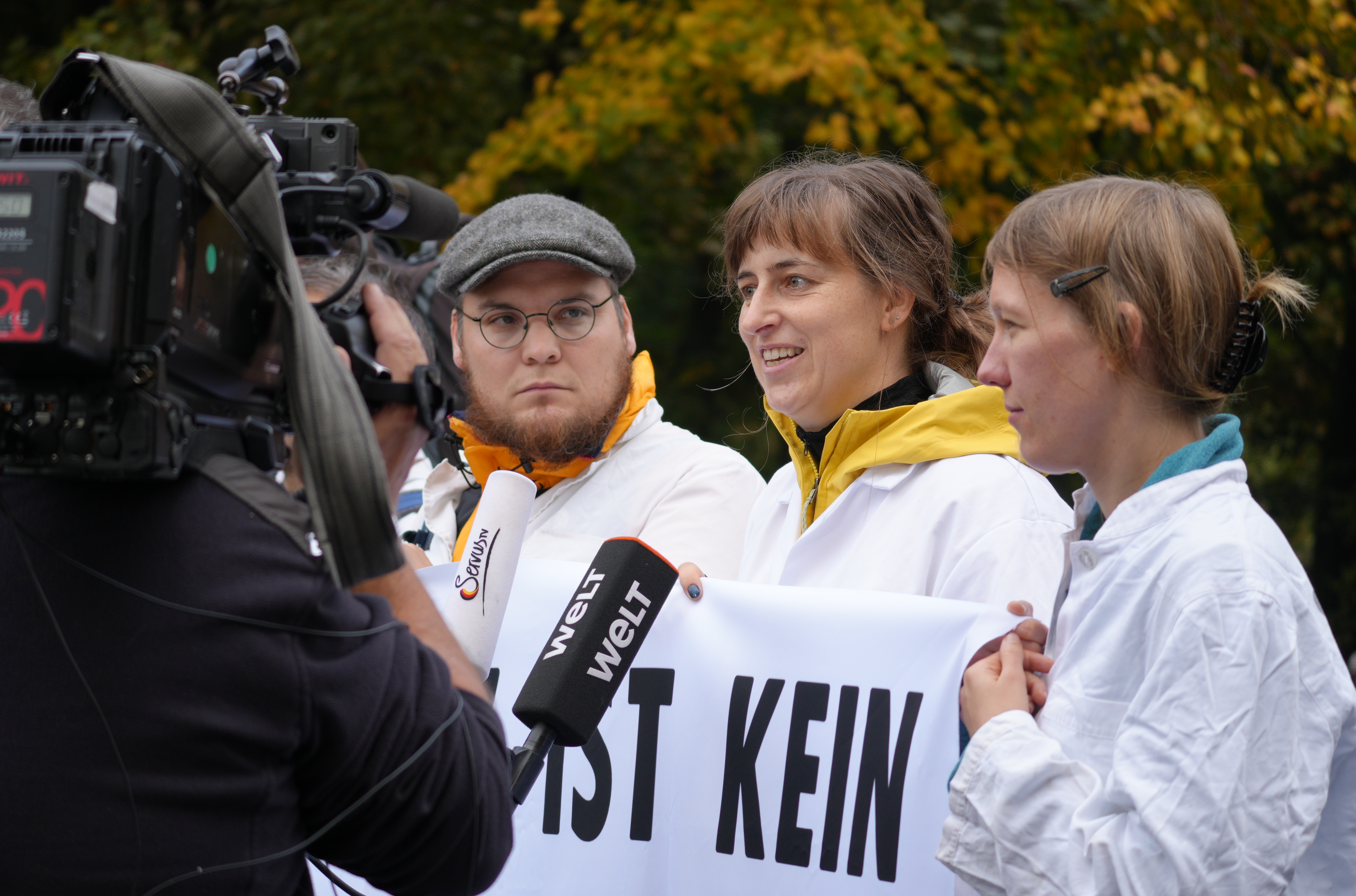
Members of Scientist Rebellion being interviewed by national television at the Last Generation Massenblockade Berlin on 28 October 2023

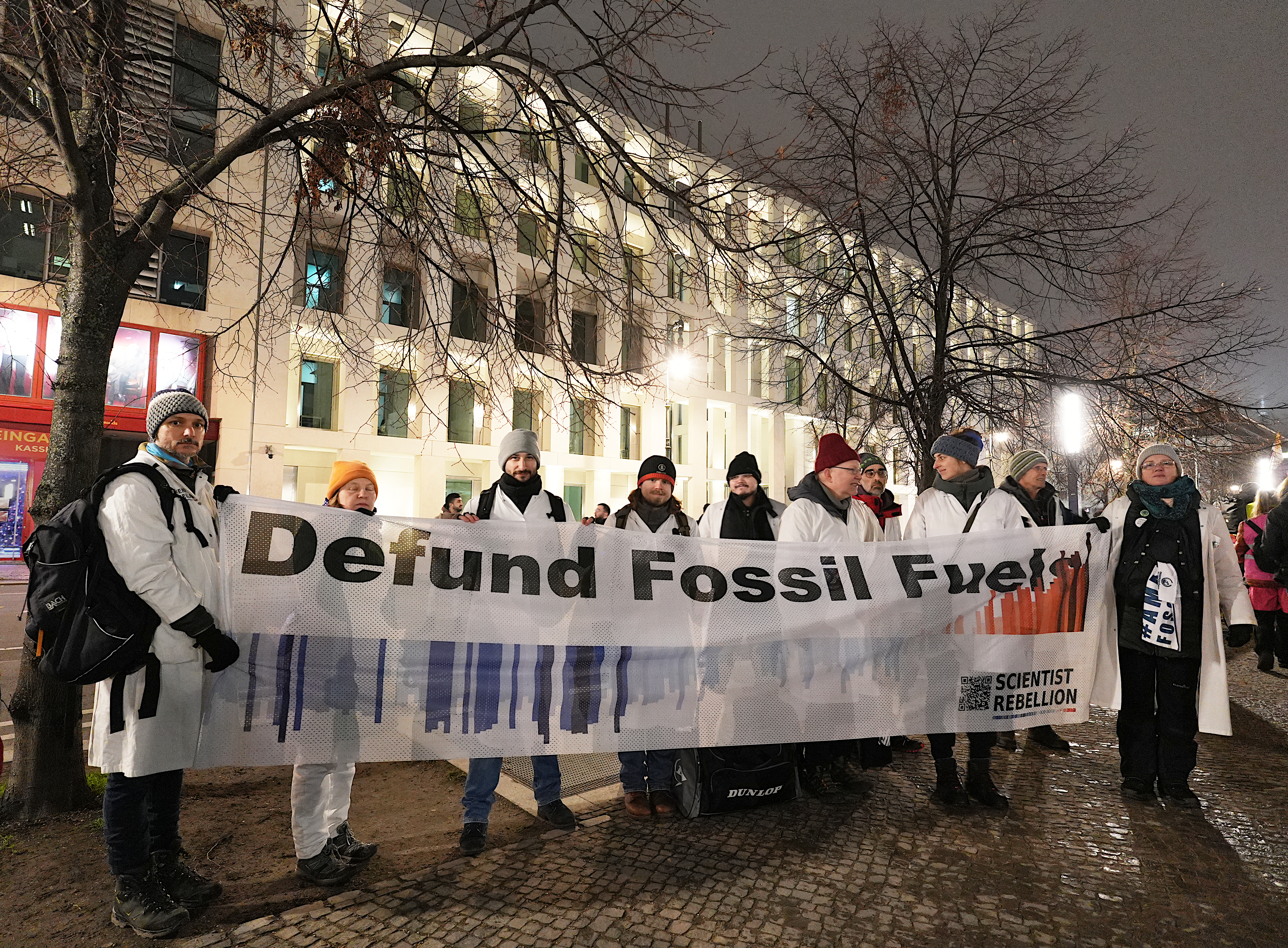
Scientist Rebellion banner reading "Defund fossil fuels" at Frack Off demo in Berlin on 10 December 2024

Scientist Rebellion is an international scientists' environmentalist group that campaigns for degrowth, climate justice, and more effective climate change mitigation.

More specifically, Scientist Rebellion is a network of academics that tries to raise awareness by engaging in non-violent civil disobedience. It is a sister organization to Extinction Rebellion. The group was co-founded by Mike Lynch-White and Dr. Tim Hewlett, who splattered paint on the headquarters of the Royal Society in September 2020, the group's first action.

Front‑line participation is limited to scientists, scholars, and academics. The white lab coats worn provide a simple way of being identified as scientists.

== Actions ==
Scientist Rebellion carried out various protests during the COP26 meeting. On 6 November 2021, activists blocked George V Bridge in Glasgow.

In August 2021, the group leaked parts of the pre-final Working Group III contribution, covering climate change mitigation, to the Sixth Assessment Report (AR6) prior to intergovernmental approval.

Police use brushes to free a protester's hand glued to the road during the Scientist Rebellion blockade of the Kronprinzenbrücke, Berlin, 6 April 2022

In April 2022, Scientist Rebellion blocked roads in Berlin in protest against oil extraction in the North Sea. In late 2022, several activists protested at Autostadt Wolfsburg by gluing themselves to the floor at the Porsche exhibit hall, later complaining they were left alone overnight.

In October 2023, Dr Gianluca Grimalda, a member, made international headlines by refusing to fly via plane from a field research assignment in Papua New Guinea. Instead, he intended to slow travel via container ships and land routes to save 4.5 tonnes of CO2 equivalent. His employer, Kiel Institute, threatened termination of his employment contract should he not arrive rapidly and later did apparently follow through.

During the COP28 meeting in December 2023, scientists from Scientist Rebellion signed an open letter calling on the public to become climate activists. Some signatories had contributed to previous IPCC Assessment Reports.

Together with Last Generation, the group co-organized the Starving for honesty climate hunger strike in Berlin in mid-2024.

Scientist Rebellion together with 61 scientists, including Michael Meeropol, Don Trent Jacobs Allan J. Singer, Stefan Sommer, endorsed an appeal created by Fridays For Future International which is linking peace, justice and climate. The main idea of the appeal is that we can not stop the ecological crisis without stopping overconsumption and this is impossible as wars continue because GDP is directly feeding the military potential. As climate change threaten more or less all, even the billionaires, it is good for all to establish peace and justice. 24 organizations endorsed the appeal as well as some prominent activists like Tori Tsui, Betsy Rosenberg.

== Debate and impact ==
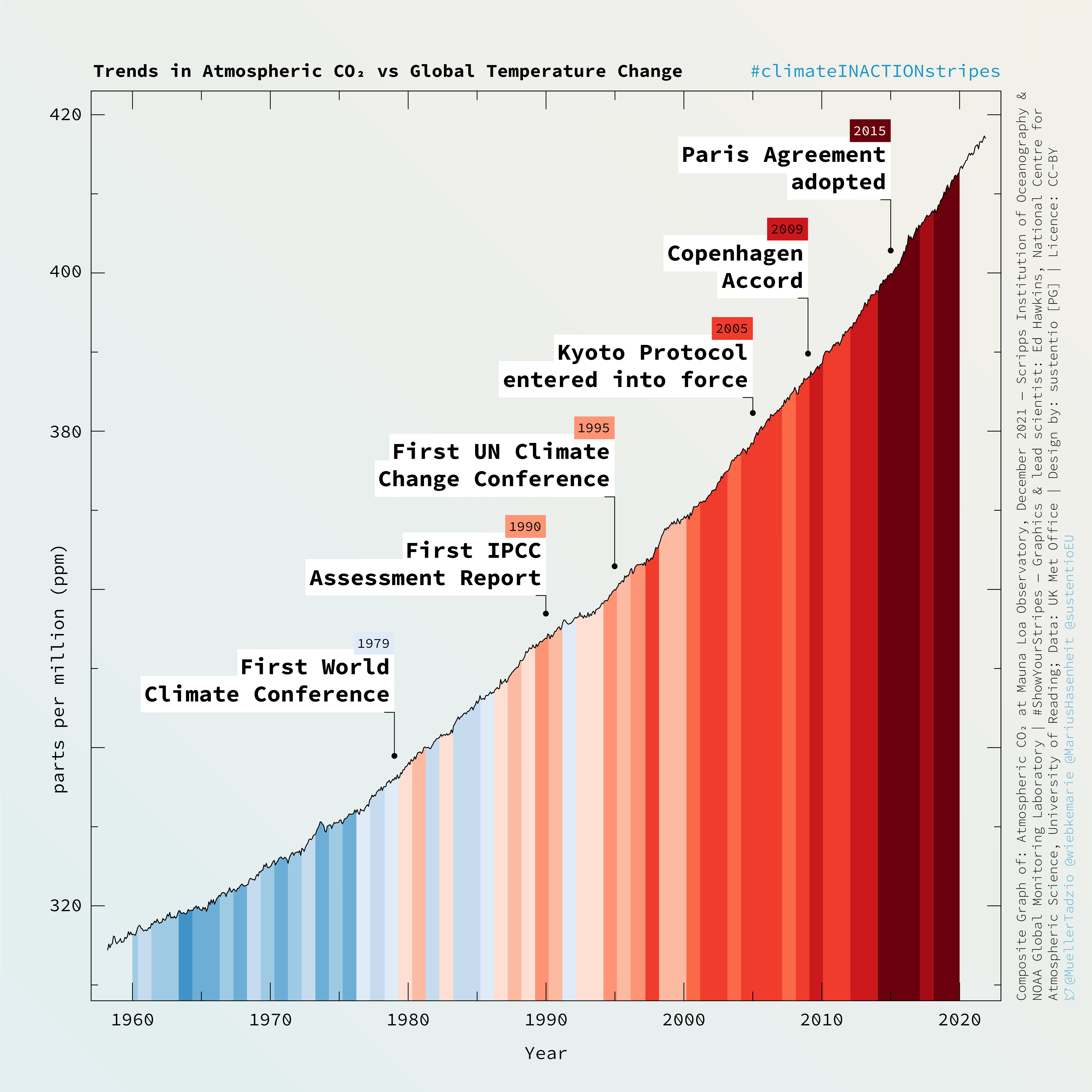
Trend in atmospheric carbon‑dioxide equivalent concentrations against global temperature change. With key international milestones marked.

Several researchers affiliated with the movement have argued for civil disobedience by colleagues, hypothesizing that such actions may lead to significant net changes in pro‑climate public opinion due to the "potential to cut through the myriad complexities and confusion" present in much of the current public discourse. Online text-based news media reviewed the commentary.

Climate scientist Peter Kalmus has described his motivations for being arrested in Los Angeles with Scientist Rebellion in 2022. And climate scientist Rose Abramoff was arrested for similar reasons in Washington DC at much that same time.

== Personalities ==
Gianluca Grimalda, Italian climatologist and behavioural economist, 1st employee to receive compensation following dismissal linked to climate change.

== See also ==
- Extinction Rebellion
- Warming stripes
