= Chellis Glendinning =

American writer (born 1947)

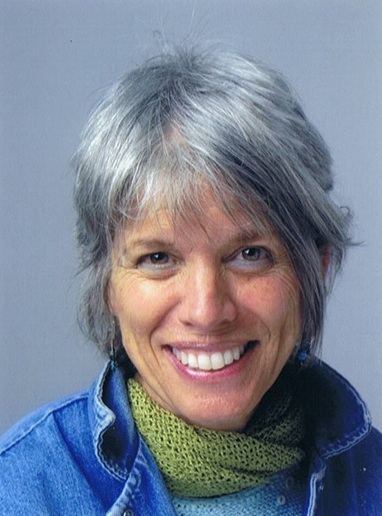
- Glendinning in 2010
- Born: June 18, 1947 (age 79); Cleveland, Ohio, U.S.
- Education: University of California, Berkeley; Columbia Pacific University
- Writing career
- Movement: Ecopsychology

Chellis Glendinning (born June 18, 1947 in Cleveland, Ohio, United States) is an author and activist. She has been called a pioneer in the concept of ecopsychology—the belief that promoting environmentalism is healthy. She is a social-change activist with an emphasis on feminism, bioregionalism, and indigenous rights. She promotes human cultures which are land-based and confined to bioregions, and is a critic of the use of technology. She has resided in Bolivia since 2006, and now holds Bolivian citizenship.

== Career ==
In 2007 Glendinning's bilingual folk opera De Un Lado Al Otro, was presented at the Lensic Theater in Santa Fe, New Mexico.

Glendinning graduated from the University of California, Berkeley in social sciences in 1969. She graduated as a Phi Beta Kappa from her university. She received her doctorate in psychology from Columbia Pacific University.

Her papers are housed in the Labadie Collection of the University of Michigan.

== Books ==
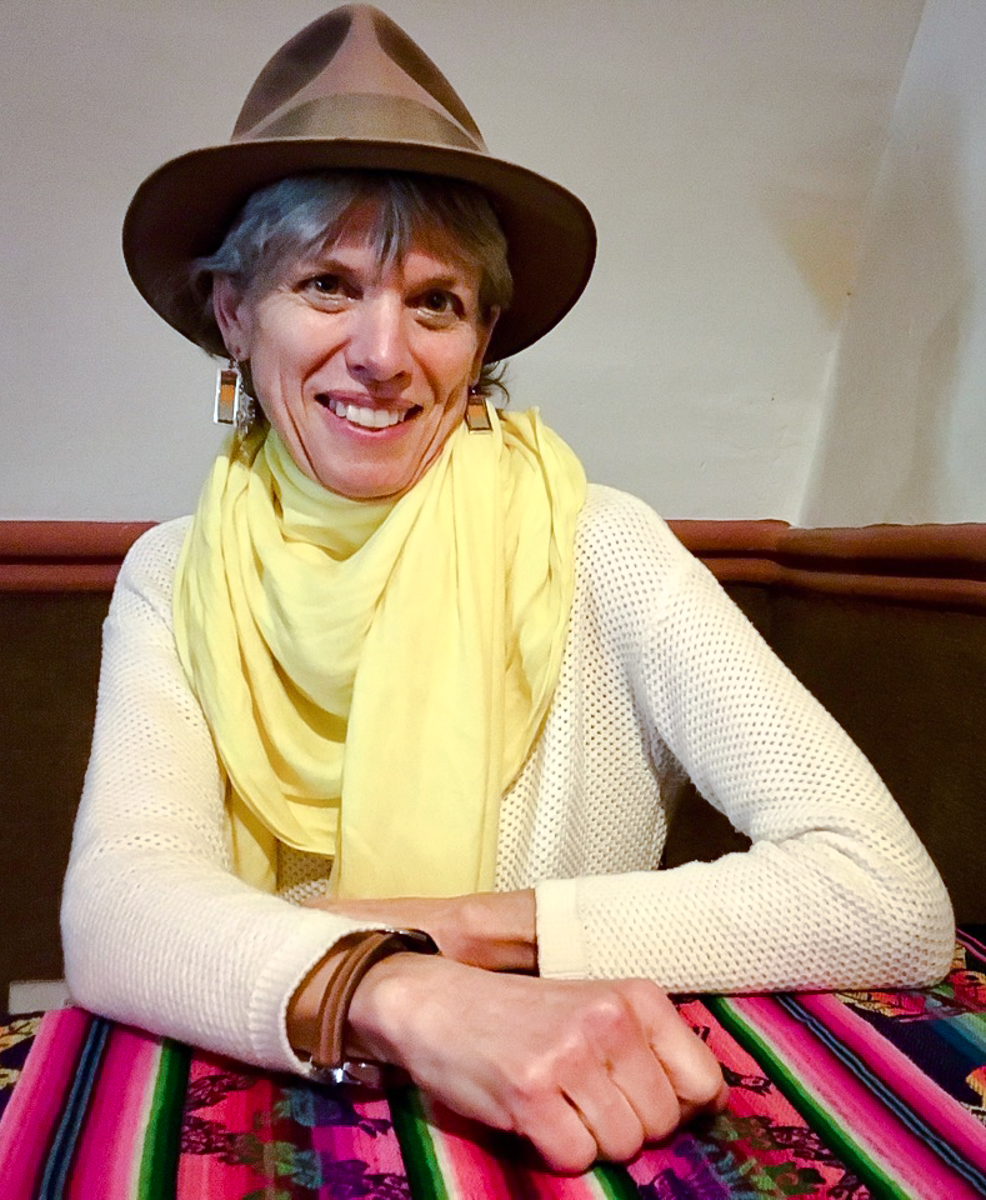
Chellis Glendinning in Bolivia ca. 2016

- Waking Up in the Nuclear Age. William Morrow, 1987. ISBN 978-0688069377
- When Technology Wounds: The Human Consequences of Progress. New York: William Morrow, 1990. ISBN 978-0688072827
- My Name Is Chellis and I’m in Recovery from Western Civilization. Gabriola BC Canada: New Society Publishers/New Catalyst/ Sustainability Classics, 2007; and Boston: Shambhala Publications, 1994. ISBN 978-0877739968
- Off the Map: An Expedition Deep into Empire and the Global Economy, New Society Publishers, 2002; and Off the Map: An Expedition Deep into Imperialism, the Global Economy and Other Earthly Whereabouts, Shambhala Publications, 1999. ISBN 9780865714632
- A Map: From the Old Connecticut Path to the Rio Grande Valley and All the Meaning In between. Great Barrington MA: E.F. Schumacher Society, 1999.
- Chiva: A Village Takes on the Global Heroin Trade. New Society Publishers, 2005. ISBN 9780865715134
- Luddite.com: A book-blog mired in irony by Chellis Glendinning in honor of the 200th anniversary of the Luddite Rebellion 1811-1813 to 2011-2013. Google/www.blogger.com, 2012. (Note: This project is a website and not a book, despite this, Glendinning officially considers this as one of her "books" by listing it as such on her official website, chellisglendinning.org) ludditeluddite1812.blogspot.com/
- Objetos. Editorial 3600, 2018. ISBN 978-99974-347-9-1
- In the Company of Rebels. New Village Press, 2019. ISBN 9781613320952

== See also ==
- Deep ecology
