= Hans Baumann (inventor) =

German-American inventor and engineer (1930–2025)

Hans D. Baumann
- Born: October 12, 1930; Germany
- Died: March 25, 2025 (aged 94)
- Occupations: Inventor, engineer, author

Hans D. Baumann (October 12, 1930 – March 25, 2025) was a German-American inventor and engineer. He has registered over 200 patents and produced 105 publications. He is known internationally as a valve specialist and was an expert on aerodynamic noise of gases and he was a frequent contributor to the NEWSMAX Magazine INSIDERS website.

== Life and career ==
Baumann came to the United States from Germany in 1953, as an exchange student. He held degrees from [Case Institute of Technology (now part of Case Western Reserve University)] and Northeastern University, and earned a Ph.D. in Mechanical Engineering from Columbia Pacific University.

Baumann worked as Chief Engineer at W. & T. Co., a valve supplier in Germany; Manager of Research & Development at Worthington S/A in France; Director of Engineering at Cashco, Inc., in the U.S.; Vice President of Masoneilan International, Inc.; and Senior Vice President of Technology for Fisher Controls. In 1977, he founded H. D. Baumann Assoc., Ltd., manufacturing control valves; the company was subsequently acquired by Fisher Instruments, and is now part of Emerson Process Management.

Baumann was a licensed Professional Engineer in four states and a member of Sigma Xi, the Scientific Research Society.

Baumann died on March 25, 2025, at the age of 94.

== Awards ==
- Honorary Member of the International Society of Automation
- Inductee "Process Automation Hall of Fame"
- Life Fellow Member of the American Society mechanical Engineers.

== Publications ==
- "Top-heavy management drains companies", InTech, May 2008
- "Outsourcing—Good or Evil?", Mechanical Engineering
- Control Valve Primer: A User's Guide (ISBN 1556176406)
- The Ideal Enterprise (ISBN 0533141850).
- Hitler's Fate: The Final Story (ISBN 1847481353).
- Building Lean Companies: How To Keep Companies Profitable As They Grow (ISBN 978-1-60037-488-3)
- The Vanished Life of Eva Braun (ISBN 978-1-4489-5136-9)
- Atomic Irony, how German Uranium helped to defeat Japan (ISBN 978-1-944393-10-6)

== Significant scientific publications ==
- Source: INTERNATIONAL ELECTRICAL COIMMISSION, Geneva, Switzerland. IEC Standards: 60534-2-1, 60534-8-3, 60534-8-4.
- Baumann, H.D., "A unifying Method for Sizing Throttling Valves Under Laminar or Transitional Flow Conditions", Journal of Fluids Engineering, Vol. 115, No. 1, March 1993, pp. 166–168
- Baumann, H. D., 'A Method for Predicting Aerodynamic Valve Noise Based on Modified Free Jet Noise Theories," ASME Paper 87-WA/NCA-728, December 1987.
- Baumann, H. D. and George W. Page Jr. 'A Method to Predict Sound Levels from Hydrodynamic Sources Associated with Flow through Throttling Valves,' Noise Control Engineering Journal, Vol. 43, No. 5, September–October 1995 _pp. 145–158.
- Baumann, H. 0., "Determination of Peak internal Sound Frequency Generated by Throttling Valves for the Calculation of Pipe Transmission Losses,' Noise Control Engineering Journal, Vol. 36, No. 2, March–April 1991, pp. 75–82.
- Contributing Author of I.I. NOISE AND VIBRATION ENGINEERING, (ISBN 978047144942-3)
- Contributing Author to: PROCESS CONTROL AND OPTIMIZATION, (ISBN 0-8493-1081-4 [v.2])
