= Prostitution in Kenya =

Prostitution in Kenya is widespread. The legal situation is complex. Although prostitution is not criminalised by National law, municipal by-laws may prohibit it. (Nairobi banned all sex work in December 2017). It is illegal to profit from the prostitution of others, and to aid, abet, compel or incite prostitution. (Sections 153 and 154 of the Penal Code). UNAIDS estimate there to be 133,675 prostitutes in the country.

Many foreign men and women take part in sex tourism, which is thriving at resorts along Kenya's coast. Thousands of girls and boys are involved in casual child prostitution due to poverty in the region.

Sex workers report abuse, extortion and violence from the police.

Japanese prostitutes (the Karayuki-san) serviced British colonialists in Kenya.

== Sex tourism on the coast ==
The ministry for tourism in Kenya has been severely criticised because of its lack of response to the booming sex tourism and child exploitation on the Kenyan coast.

In 2006, a study by UNICEF reported that up to 30% of the population of children aged between 12 and 18 in the coastal regions of Malindi, Mombasa, Kilifi and Diani were engaged in some form of sex work.

== Prostitution and health ==
Access to health services is guaranteed by Article 43 of the Kenyan Constitution. However sex workers are often discriminated against and access to health services limited.

Kenya is one of the world's most HIV affected countries. Sex workers are the most affected group within the country. Research has shown that around 30% of sex workers are HIV positive.

Lack of condom use, (both amongst sex workers and the general public), fuelled the spread of HIV and other STIs. Since 2001, the Kenyan Government has been distributing free condoms (180 million in 2013) and educating the public on their use. The University of Nairobi and Prof Elizabeth Ngugi established a program with local prostitutes to educate and empower them by encouraging condom use. A study of Nairobi sex workers in 2015 reported about two thirds always use condoms with clients. This compares with 40% amongst members of the general public who have two or more partners.

HIV and STI testing is voluntary, however as the HIV and AIDS Prevention and Control Act 2006 criminalised HIV transmission, there is some reluctance for sex workers to get tested. The 2015 Nairobi sex workers' study found 86% had been tested, 63% within the previous 12 months.

This sudden rise in sex tourism goes on with the Kenyan Tourism Police's full knowledge. They do not want to discourage tourists from coming to Kenya's coast, regardless of the damage it does to young Kenyans.

== Sex trafficking ==
Kenya is a source, transit, and destination country for men, women, and children subjected to sex trafficking. Boys were increasingly subjected to trafficking. Girls and boys are exploited in commercial sex throughout Kenya, including in sex tourism in Nairobi, Kisumu, and on the coast, particularly in informal settlements; at times, their exploitation is facilitated by family members. Children are also exploited in sex trafficking by people working in khat (a mild narcotic) cultivation areas, near gold mines in western Kenya, by truck drivers along major highways, and by fishermen on Lake Victoria. Kenyans are recruited by legal or illegal employment agencies or voluntarily migrate to Europe, the United States, Southeast Asia, and the Middle East, particularly Saudi Arabia, Lebanon, Kuwait, Qatar, the UAE, and Oman, in search of employment, where at times they are exploited in massage parlours and brothels. Reports allege gay and bisexual Kenyan men are deceptively recruited from universities with promises of overseas jobs, but are forced into prostitution in Qatar and UAE. Kenyan women are subjected to forced prostitution in Thailand by Ugandan and Nigerian traffickers.

Some children in Dadaab and Kakuma refugee camps may be subjected to sex trafficking. Children from East Africa and South Sudan are subjected to sex trafficking in Kenya. Trucks transporting goods from Kenya to Somalia returned to Kenya with girls and women subsequently exploited in brothels in Nairobi or Mombasa. Nepalese and Indian women recruited to work in mujra dance clubs in Nairobi and Mombasa face debt bondage, which they are forced to pay off by dancing and forced prostitution.

The United States Department of State Office to Monitor and Combat Trafficking in Persons ranks Kenya as a 'Tier 2' country.

== Online prostitution in Kenya ==
The boom of online prostitution has been fueled by social media sites such as Tinder and Facebook. In The Verge, November 7, 2014, Frenzen C. was quoted saying, “A group that wants to ban all sex work in Ireland is making fake Tinder profiles” in order to discourage the use of the dating app as a prostitution enabler. According to Fondation Scelles, a French NGO, apps such as AirBnB are being used for such accommodation reservations and in Kenya, the trade has made the shift to online platforms on infamous websites such as: kenyanescorts, nairobihot, kenyaraha and many more bold examples all of whom own .com domains that have been active for more than a decade. However, this new kind of prostitution still hides behind exotic services such as massage therapy and escort services. Online platforms present a greater enforcement challenge than conventional prostitution. The Internet enables clients and working girls to communicate from entirely different locations in making their arrangements. The numbers just keep growing.

== See also ==
- Sex for fish
- British soldiers and allegations of sexual exploitation in Kenya

== Bibliography ==
- Robinson: Risk-Coping through Sexual Networks. 2011
- Nairobi Nights: Blog of a Nairobi sex worker
- Luise White: The Comforts of Home: Prostitution in Colonial Nairobi. University of Chicago 1990
- Anatomy of prostitutes and prostitution in Kenya. University of Nairobi 1973
- 'Prostitution', 'Risk,'and 'Responsibility': Paradigms of AIDS Prevention and Women's Identities in Thika, Kenya, K Kielmann, in An anthropology of infectious disease: international health perspectives, By Marcia Claire Inhorn, Peter J. Brown. Routledge 1997
- Anatomy of Prostitutes and Prostitution in Kenya. JM Gachuhi 1973. Institute for Development Studies,

=== History ===
- Prostitution, Identity, and Class Consciousness in Nairobi during World War II. Luise White. Signs. Vol. 11, No. 2 (Winter, 1986), pp. 255–273
- Women's domestic labor in colonial Kenya: Prostitution in Nairobi, 1909-1950. Luise White, Boston University 1980
