= Columbia Pacific University =

Distance learning school in California

- Type: Non-traditional, distance learning
- Active: 1978–2000
- Location: Novato, California, United States; 38.07119°N 122.52872°W

Columbia Pacific University (CPU) was a defunct unaccredited distance-learning institution in Novato, California, United States. It was founded in 1978 and closed by California court order in 2000.

== History ==
=== Initial licensing in California ===
In 1983, after four years of operating under a basic authorization licensing, CPU's programs in administration and management received institutional approval from the California Department of Education Private Postsecondary Education Division. On June 2, 1986, the California Department of Education granted all of CPU's programs full institutional approval for a three-year period, ruling that CPU's curricula met California Education Code Section 94310(b)'s statutory requirement of being "consistent in quality with curricula offered by appropriate established accredited institutions which are recognized by the United States Department of Education."

=== Changes to California licensing law ===
California passed the Private Postsecondary Education Act, changing state regulations for approved schools in 1989. This law established the Council for Private Postsecondary and Vocational Education (CPPVE) as the single State agency responsible for reviewing and approving private postsecondary institutions in California. Legislation in 1997 providing "authorization for continuation of the Reform Act was vetoed due to political pressures and concerns about the level of fees, the way in which Council staff was carrying out its responsibilities, and the absence of an administrative appeals" process. In a meeting of the ASSEMBLY COMMITTEE ON HIGHER EDUCATION the veto of CPPVE was said to be caused by unfairly high fees charged to smaller institutions and "vindictiveness by Council staff" to institutions that didn't comply. With new legislation in 1997 "the Legislature created the Bureau for Private Postsecondary and Vocational Education" within the Department of Consumer Affairs, and transferred "responsibility for administration of the Reform Act from the Council to the Bureau" placing CPU under the authority of the California Bureau for Private Postsecondary and Vocational Education (BPPVE). Staffing and funding of the Bureau was transitioned over a period of years such that the Council continued to operate until 2005 and BPPVE ceased operation in 2007 due to a sunset clause in the law. California Department of Education Private Postsecondary Education Division also ceased operation in 2007. Institutions that were in good standing with BPPVE were allowed to continue operation under existing approvals that were valid for two years, until the (BPPE) "Bureau for Private Postsecondary Education came into existence on January 1, 2010, following passage of Assembly Bill 48, known as the California Private Postsecondary Education Act of 2009" (California Education Code, Title 3, Division 10, Part 59, Chapter 8).

The BPPVE was not intended to be a recognized accreditor, nor did its approval serve as a substitute for educational accreditation. California laws were in transition for several years leaving the future of unaccredited institutions in doubt. Under BPPE both accredited and non-accredited institutions may apply for approval to operate in California. Under BPPVE state approval was, however, a prerequisite in order for a private institution to become accredited. BPPVE informational materials stated "Approval is not the same as accreditation."

=== Site visits and CPU's response: 1994–1995 ===
In 1994, Marin County inspectors discovered eight permitless dormitories on CPU founder Les Carr's property. Marin County officials cited Carr for "multiple zoning, safety, and health violations". Carr was forced to remove the dormitories, as well as to remove references to the property as "a retreat center on a beautiful 14-acre (57,000 m^{2}) ranch in northern Marin county" in CPU's promotional literature.

An August 1995 site visit committee of the Council for Private Postsecondary and Vocational Education found that CPU had not met the new regulations. It failed the 1995 visit on the basis of 88 points. The council's review of CPU listed numerous violations of academic standards, including:

- "One master's-degree student was given credit for "a learning contract describing how he would continue taking dance lessons and watch dance demonstrations in order to improve his skills as a Country Western dancer.""
- "A Ph.D. dissertation written in Spanish was approved by four faculty who cannot speak the language."
- "One dissertation "had no hypothesis, no data collection, and no statistical analysis. A member of the visiting committee characterized the work as more like a project paper at the college freshman level." The dissertation, The Complete Guide to Glass Collecting, was 61 pages long."
- "At least nine students who received the Ph.D. degree in 1994 had been enrolled less than 20 months, four of them less than 12."

On November 15, 1995, CPU submitted a response challenging the CPPVE findings. CPU's response argued that the CPPVE's August report "is grossly in error in most details, as documented in the 86 errors of fact enumerated", and therefore argued that the CPPVE report was "utterly unreliable as an objective and thorough evaluation of CPU".

CPU's response argued that the CPPVE Visiting Committee's review of CPU dissertations was based on superficial judgments. In "Error of Fact No. 27", for example, CPU's response says that the complaint about the lack of "evidence of competency in statistical research" was erroneous because "many dissertations do not require statistical analysis". In "Error of Fact No. 28" and "Error of Fact No. 31", regarding CPPVE's finding that a Ph.D. dissertation was submitted in Spanish and reviewed by faculty who could not speak the language, CPU responded that the indicated student "provided an authenticated English translation" and had been working with a Spanish-fluent mentor who resided in Venezuela.

=== Closure and appeals: 1995–2000 ===
CPPVE director Kenneth Miller issued CPU a Denial of Application for Approval in December 1995.

CPU administrators appealed the decision to close the school, but an administrative court judge ruled against the appeal on June 10, 1997. Among other items, the administrative appeals judge found that CPU:

- awarded excessive credit for prior experiential learning to many students;
- failed to employ duly qualified faculty; and
- failed to meet various requirements for issuing PhD degrees.

In the state's 1997 lawsuit to compel CPU to close, California Deputy Attorney General Asher Rubin called the correspondence school "a diploma mill which has been preying on California consumers for too many years" and "a consumer fraud, a complete scam". The suit also referred to Columbia Pacific University as a "phony operation" offering "totally worthless [degrees]...to enrich its unprincipled promoters".

On December 2, 1999, the Marin County Superior Court ordered the school be shut down, also levying $10,000 in fines against CPU for its "deceptive and unfair practices" in operating without authorization and failing to disclose its status to prospective students during the appeals process. Judge Lynn Duryee noted in her decision that "The decision is not whether or not the students are dissatisfied... I mean that is not the test. It's like saying, you know, that prostitution should not be illegal because the customers are satisfied. It's not the test."

This appeal was lost in 2000 and CPU was ordered to close. The Supreme Court of California upheld the denial of CPU's approval to operate.

CPU alumni acquired all rights to the CPU name and registered a "Columbia Pacific University", a non-profit organization in Delaware. Until 2007, the CPU Press continued its publication program.

== Legal status of CPU degrees ==
California recognizes CPU degrees earned before June 25, 1997, as "legally valid" for use in the state. CPU degrees earned on or after June 25, 1997, are "not legally valid" for use in California.

Michigan: "Please note that individual degree programs that have not been accredited by the recognized programmatic accrediting body might not be accepted."

Texas: "Texas has recognized CPU degrees recognized by California as legally valid."

== Notable alumni ==
- Barbara De Angelis: relationship consultant, lecturer and author, TV personality, relationship and personal growth adviser
- Hans Baumann, inventor and engineer
- Nathan Lopes Cardozo, Jewish author and speaker
- Chellis Glendinning, ecopsychologist, author, activist
- John Gray, author of Men are from Mars, Women are from Venus
- Don Trent Jacobs (Four Arrows), Native American educator and author
- Anodea Judith, therapist, author of Wheels of Life
- Bernard Meltzer, talk radio host
- Elizabeth Ngugi, professor of community health at the University of Nairobi and HIV/AIDS expert.
