= Don Trent Jacobs =

American professor from Missouri

- Born: Donald Trent Jacobs; 1946 (age 79–80); St. Louis, Missouri, United States
- Other name: Four Arrows
- Education: Southwest Missouri State University, Boise State University, Columbia Pacific University
- Occupation: Online (distance education) college professor

Donald Trent Jacobs (born 1946) is an American college professor and writer whose subject matter includes American Indian rights, Indigenous worldviews, wellness, and counter-hegemonic education. He lives in Mexico.

He is a made-relative (Hunka) of the Oglala Medicine Horse Tiospaye and given the name "Wahinkpe Topa," a Lakota phrase translated as "Four Arrows".

== Early life and education ==
Donald Trent Jacobs was born in St. Louis, Missouri in 1946.

Jacobs has a bachelor's degree from Southwest Missouri State University, an Ed.D. from Boise State University, and a Ph.D from Columbia Pacific University and an Ed.D. in Curriculum and Instruction with a cognate in Indigenous Worldview from Boise State University..

His public biography states that he has "Cherokee, and Scots-Irish ancestry." However he states in his book Restoring the Kinship Worldview: Indigenous Voices Introduce 28 Precepts for Rebalancing Life on Planet Earth, "As an Irish man with unproven Cherokee heritage, I was made a relative of the Oglala Lakota." For the Lakota, the making of a relative is one of the seven sacred ceremonies, and its status overrides other identies.

== Career ==
Jacobs is Professor Emeritus from School of Educational Leadership for Change at Fielding Graduate University.He was formerly a tenured associate professor at Northern Arizona University and prior to that Dean of Education at Oglala Lakota College on the Pine Ridge Indian Reservation in South Dakota. In 2014 he was put on the International Fulbright Scholars list. In 2004 he received the Moral Courage Award from the Martin Springer Institute at Northern Arizona University for his activism. In 2009, the American Education Resource Organization selected him as one of "27 visionaries in education" for their text, Turning Points.

In late May 2025, a 100% Indigenous-based AI was introduced to the world as the first of its kind.

== Works ==
Jacobs (Four Arrows) has written and published 23 books and numerous articles and invited book chapters, including:

1. Four Arrows (2026). One Mandate, Two Worldviews, Seven Generations. Justice Press
2. Four Arrows and Bram Dufee (2023) Hypnotic Communication in Medical Emergency Settings. Routledge.
3. Four Arrows and Darcia Narvaez (2022) Restoring the Kinship Worldview. NAB/Penguin/Random House
4. Four Arrows (2020) Sitting Bulls Words for a World in Crises, DIO Press
5. Four Arrows (2016) Point of Departure: Returning to Our Authentic Worldview for Education and Survival. Information Age Publishing
6. Four Arrows (2013) Teaching Truly: A Curriculum to Indigenize Mainstream Education. New York: Peter Lang
7. Four Arrows (2011) Differing Worldviews in Higher Education: Two Disagreeing Scholars Argue Cooperatively about Justice Education. Netherlands: Sense Publishers
8. Four Arrows (2011). Last Song of the Whales. Maui, Hawaii: Savant Press
9. Four Arrows, a.k.a. Jacobs, D.T. and Cajete, G. (2010), Critical Neurophilosophy and Indigenous Wisdom. Netherlands: Sense Publishers
10. Four Arrows, a.k.a. Jacobs, D.T. (2008) The Authentic Dissertation: Alternative Ways of Knowing, Research and Representation. London: Routledge
11. Four Arrows. (2006) The Shrimp Habit: How it is Destroying Our World. Victoria: Trafford.
12. Four Arrows, a.k.a. Jacobs, D.T. Ed., (2006) Unlearning the Language of Conquest: Scholars Challenge Anti-Indianism in America. Austin: University of Texas Press.
13. Four Arrows and Fetzer, J. (2004) American Assassination: The Strange Death of Senator Paul Wellstone. New York: Vox Pop.
14. Jacobs, D. and Jacobs-Spencer, J. (2001) Teaching Virtues: Building Character Across the Curriculum. Landham, Md.: Scarecrow Education Press, a division of Rowman and Littlefield.
15. Jacobs, D. (1997) Primal Awareness: A True Story of Survival, Transformation and Awakening with the Raramuri Shamans of Mexico. Rochester, Vt.: Inner Traditions International.
16. Jacobs, D. (1994 ) The Bum’s Rush: The Selling of Environmental Backlash. Boise, Id.: Legendary Publishing.
17. Jacobs, D. (1988) Patient Communication for First Responders: The First Hour of Trauma. Englewood Cliffs, N.J.: Prentice-Hall.
18. Jacobs, D. (1988) Physical Fitness Programs for Public Safety Employees, 2nd edition, Boston: NFPA.

== Activism ==
Four Arrows, aka Don Trent Jacobs, is recipient of the Martin Springer Institute for Social Studies Moral Courage Award for his pro Indian and counter-hegemonic activis. Together with 60 other scientists, endorsed an appeal linking peace, justice and climate created by Fridays For Future International. The main idea of the appeal is that we can not stop the ecological crisis without stopping overconsumption and this is impossible as wars continue because GDP is directly linked to military potential. As climate change threaten more or less all, even the billionaires, it is good for all to establish peace and justice. 24 organizations including Scientist Rebellion endorsed the appeal.
