= Bila M. Kapita =

Congolese cardiologist

Bila Minlangu Kapita
- Born: Bas-Congo, Belgian Congo
- Other names: Kapita Bila, Kapita Bila Minlangu, Kapita Bila Mirlangu
- Occupation: Cardiologist

Bila M. Kapita is a doctor from Kinshasa, Democratic Republic of the Congo who aided in initial research efforts investigating HIV/AIDS in Africa in the 1980s and 1990s. Kapita is credited as one of the first African scientists to independently identify that AIDS was prevalent in Central Africa. Research work in collaboration with Project SIDA helped identify and publicize the heterosexual sexual transmission of HIV. Following his research career, he continued caring for patients with HIV/AIDS and has more recently returned to practicing cardiology.

== Biography ==
=== Early life and career ===
Bila M. Kapita was raised in a Swedish mission in the Bas-Congo province of the former Belgian Congo.

Kapita received medical training in Brussels, Belgium at the Cliniques Universitaires Saint-Luc, where he focused on cardiology, publishing several research articles on the subject dating back to 1975.

Upon return to Zaire, Kapita practiced cardiology and general medicine at the Mama Yemo Hospital, becoming head of internal medicine. Kapita was well established in Kinshasa and served as the head of the Kinshasa Medical Association.

=== Work with HIV/AIDS in Kinshasa ===
Kapita noted in retrospect that patients at his hospital displayed an increased amount of Kaposi's sarcoma beginning in the mid-1970s. Around the same time, patients were more frequently suffering from Cryptococcal meningitis. Both diseases are opportunistic infections which were significant of decreased immune system response in patients.

Following the initial connection between these opportunistic infections in the United States in 1981, African scientists including Kapita recognized the similar clinical presentation. The prevalence of what would soon become known as AIDS in African countries caught the attention of European and American researchers. The United States’ Centers for Disease Control and National Institute of Allergy and Infectious Diseases were alerted to the rising pandemic by former collaborators in Ebola research from Europe such as Peter Piot. A group of researchers from Belgium, the United States, and France were first introduced to the state of Africa's AIDS pandemic in the isolation wards of Kapita's hospital.

Kapita was welcoming to the international researchers, allowing them to work from his hospital for long periods of time. Due to Kapita's notability in Kinshasa, he was able to protect these scientists from any government discontent involving outside research at the time. Peers described Kapita as being true to his ideals and well trained.

Patients in the wards of Mama Yemo were clearly affected by AIDS per the clinical definitions in place at that time. Almost all of the patients confirmed to have AIDS using laboratory based tests were already identified by Kapita without laboratory tests. Kapita is credited by his collaborators as being one of the first people in Africa to identify the presence of AIDS. The visiting researchers would soon realize the extent of AIDS in Africa and began research in Kinshasa. The resulting collaboration between African, American, and European scientists would become known as Project SIDA.

Bila M. Kapita published his own book in 1988 titled SIDA en Afrique.

=== Project SIDA ===
From 1984 to 1991 Kapita collaborated with Project SIDA at Mama Yemo, producing between 20 and 30 research articles on the transmission, history, and future of HIV/AIDS in Africa. Work was conducted in Kapita's hospital early on in the program to increase chances of approval from government authorities.

Many of Kapita's articles focused on the rate of heterosexual transmission that was largely ignored by the United States in the early 1980s.

Kapita was present at the first International AIDS Conference in Atlanta, Georgia in 1985. Also in attendance were Project SIDA collaborators Peter Piot and Nzila Nzilambi—as well as thousands of other scientists. During the second International AIDS Conference in Paris, France, Kapita informed the community of his retrospective discovery of increased cases of Kaposi's sarcoma and cytomegalovirus, indicators that HIV/AIDS likely existed in Kinshasa as far back as 1975. Prior to public knowledge of HIV prevalence in Zaire at the time, Kapita faced the threat of becoming a political prisoner under Mobutu Sese Seko’s regime for acknowledging the issue on a global stage without permission from the government.

In 1990, as the civil war was beginning in Zaire, Kapita worked with Peter Piot in arranging an international AIDS conference in Kinshasa. The proceeds of the conference were returned to the region through donations to Mama Yemo Hospital and the establishment of a health clinic in Kapita's village.

=== Career Following Project SIDA ===
Kapita's work continued for a few years following the 1991 demise of Project SIDA. A notable collaboration featuring Kapita in 1992 was the World Health Organization publication: AIDS in Africa: A Manual for Physicians.

Following the end of Project SIDA due to civil war in Zaire, Kapita continued to appear on international research articles, the last being published in 1993. Kapita continued to work at Mama Yemo, until at least 1997, treating patients with HIV/AIDS.

A hallmark of Project SIDA was the training of Congolese researchers, resulting in many well-trained doctors such as Kapita existing in Kinshasa. American and European collaborators established traditional research procedure in Kinshasa, establishing an institutional review board led by Kapita.

Kapita and the other Zairian collaborators of Project SIDA wished to return to research, but opportunities following the civil war were limited. Currently, Kapita practices cardiology at the Centre Medical De Kinshasa in Gombe, Kinshasa.

== Partial bibliography ==
- Piot, Peter, et al. (1984-07-14). “ACQUIRED IMMUNODEFICIENCY SYNDROME IN A HETEROSEXUAL POPULATION IN ZAIRE.” The Lancet.
- Mann, Jonathan M., et al. (1986-09-27). “NATURAL HISTORY OF HUMAN IMMUNODEFICIENCY VIRUS INFECTION IN ZAIRE.” The Lancet.
- Colebunders, Robert, et al. (1988-12-31). “BREASTFEEDING AND TRANSMISSION OF HIV.” The Lancet.
- Kapita, Bila M. (1988). SIDA En Afrique.
- N’Galy, Bosenge, et al. (1988-10-27). “Human Immunodeficiency Virus Infection among Employees in an African Hospital.” New England Journal of Medicine.
- Hassig, S. E., et al. (1990) “An Analysis of the Economic Impact of HIV Infection among Patients at Mama Yemo Hospital, Kinshasa, Zaire.” AIDS.
- Piot, P., et al. (1991). “AIDS in Africa: The First Decade and Challenges for the 1990s.” AIDS.
- Piot, Peter, et al. (1992). AIDS in Africa: A Manual for Physicians. World Health Organization.
- Thea, Donald M., et al. (1993-05-01). “Prevalence of Enteric Viruses among Hospital Patients with AIDS in Kinshasa, Zaire.” Transactions of the Royal Society of Tropical Medicine and Hygiene.
