= Crown Prince Bridge =

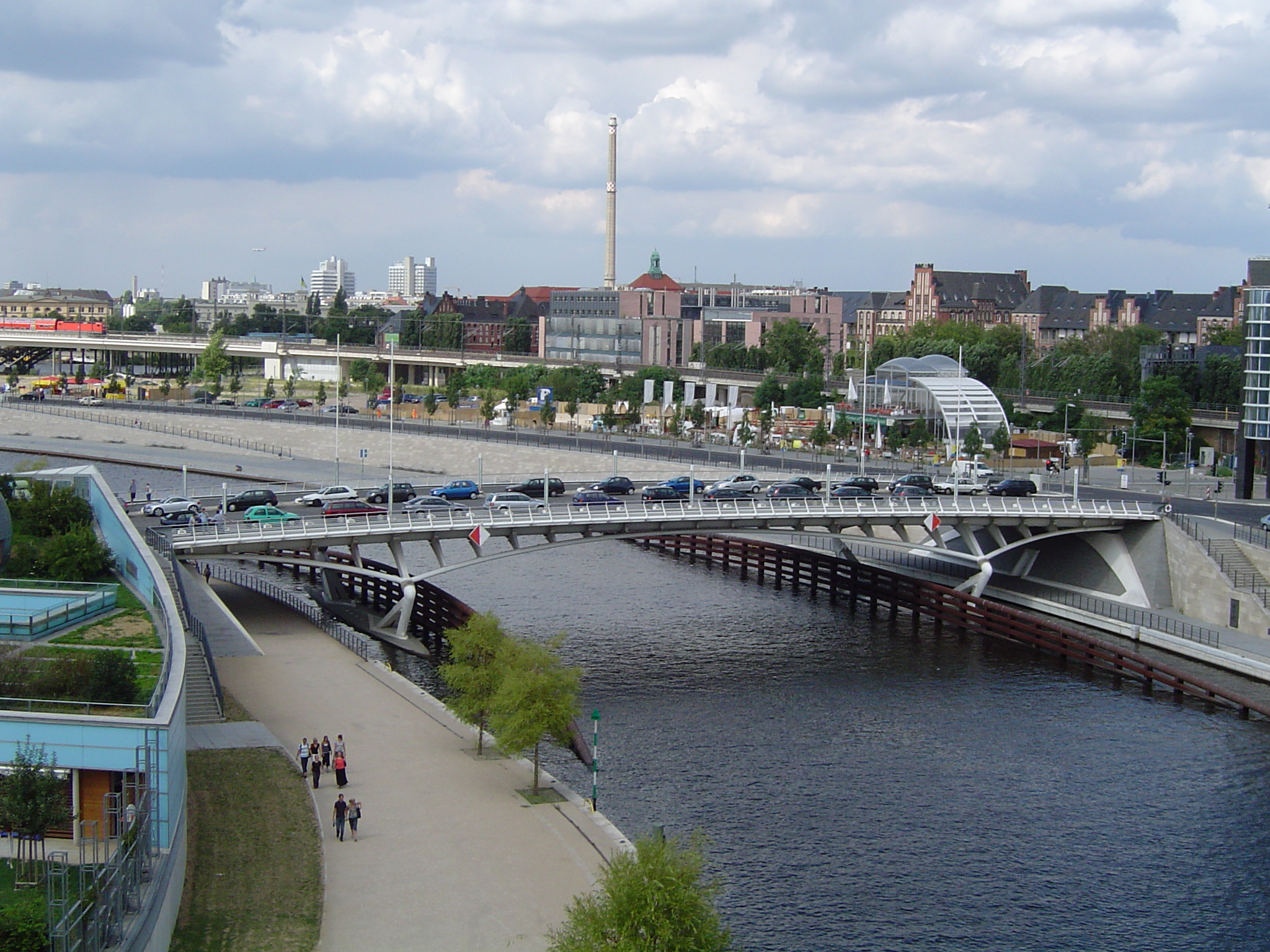
- Looking north
- Coordinates: 52.5218°N 13.3757°E
- Carries: Konrad-Adenauer-Straße
- Crosses: River Spree
- Locale: Berlin quarters of Tiergarten and Mitte

Characteristics
- Design: continuous steel beams
- Total length: 75.22 m (246.8 ft)
- Width: 22.62 m (74.2 ft)
- Longest span: 44 m (144 ft)
- Clearance below: 4.5 m (15 ft)

History
- Contracted lead designer: Santiago Calatrava, PSP Engineering Office
- Construction start: 1992
- Construction end: 1996
- Construction cost: 34 M DM

Location
- Interactive map of Crown Prince Bridge

The Crown Prince Bridge (German: Kronprinzenbrücke) is a road bridge over the River Spree in the city of Berlin. It links the Berlin quarters of Mitte and Tiergarten with the parliamentary quarter within the borough of Bezirk Mitte. The structure carries Konrad-Adenauer-Straße – the continuation of Reinhardtstraße – which has two vehicle lanes as well as cycleways and footpaths on both carriageways. Immediately on the western end of the bridge is the children's nursery of the German Bundestag and the Spreebogenpark.

== History ==
Its predecessor was a wooden bascule bridge built in 1709 below the Schönhauser Graben stream and known as the Unterbaum Bridge. In 1828 it was moved upstream and modified. From 1877 to 1879 a new bridge was built on the western Kronprinzenufer bank, and was named after the then German crown prince, Frederick William. The structure was a cast iron, timber framed, arch bridge with three arches and a width of 22 metres. The centre arch had an opening of 18.68 metres wide, the two outer arches were each 15.48 metres wide. The piers and abutments were made of clinker bricks, clad with granite in places, the foundations were of concrete.

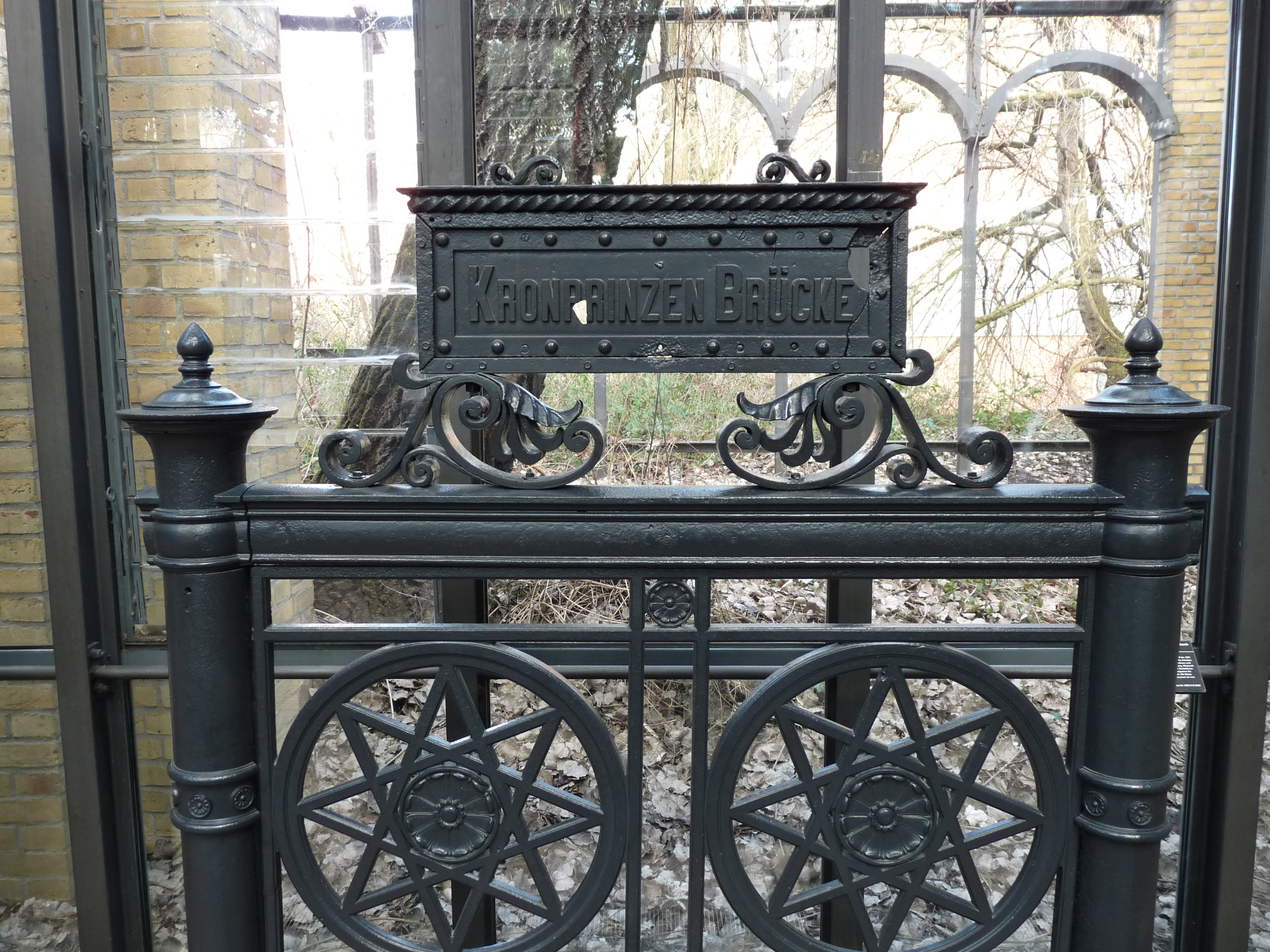
Detail of the old Crown Prince Bridge

At the end of the Second World War the Crown Prince Bridge was badly damaged and, after 1945, was provisionally maintained. With the construction of the Berlin Wall in 1961 the bridge was closed and lost its importance as a transport route because the River Spree was a sector boundary here. In 1972, it was torn down by East German officials to avoid refugees travelling from East Germany to the West. The piers and abutments were left in place.

== Present bridge ==
More than 20 years later, the bridge was rebuilt as a symbol of peace and the reunification of Germany.

Its design was based on a submission by the winner of a contest, and then was developed into a full project. Its main engineer, Gerhard Sedlacek, is the designer of the revolutionary support system holding it up on either side of the river (the elbows are visible nearest to the water). This was necessary to avoid having piers which would have hampered navigation.
