= Kinshasa General Hospital =

Coordinates: 4.3090°S 15.3057°E

Geography
- Location: Avenue Colonel Ebeya, B.P.: 169, Gombe, Kinshasa, Democratic Republic of the Congo

Organisation
- Type: General

Services
- Beds: 2,000 beds

History
- Former name: Mama Yemo Hospital
- Construction started: 1912; 113 years ago
- Opened: 1924; 101 years ago

Links
- Website: https://hgrk-mamayemo.com/

Kinshasa General Hospital (French: Hôpital Général de Kinshasa) is a hospital located in the Gombe commune of Kinshasa, Democratic Republic of Congo. Before the ousting of President Mobutu Sese Seko, it was known as Mama Yemo Hospital after the president's mother. The 2000-bed hospital registers over 3,000 consultations daily. It was one of the first places where AIDS was observed.

== History ==
Prior to independence from Belgium, the country had one of the best-regarded hospital systems on the continent - albeit one that was limited almost entirely to the white population. Doctors at the hospital recall a time when patients were transferred from South Africa to Kinshasa for a higher level of care.

After national independence (1960), most of the hospital's Belgian physicians and surgeons returned home. After the violence attending independence had quieted, American missionary physician and surgeon Dr. William Close (1924 – 2009) became administrator of the hospital and recruited physicians from around the world. The maternity ward was upgraded and soon averaged 120 deliveries a day, second only to a hospital in Tokyo. Close also oversaw the building and management of a 700-ton hospital ship that treated people up and down the Congo River. Eventually, however, Close grew disillusioned by the growing corruption and disintegration and returned home in 1977. After the ousting of Mobutu (1997), the hospital's eight operating suites were again rebuilt with Close's assistance.

Beginning in 1984, the hospital was used as a major research location for Project SIDA and research was supported by then head of internal medicine, Dr. Bila M. Kapita. In retrospect, patients were identified as far back as 1975 as presenting with conditions such as Kaposi's sarcoma that indicated HIV may have existed at the hospital years before it was identified using serological tests.

But the level of medical care remains bleak. Recent media reports indicate that the hospital often runs dangerously low on medical supplies, and doctors are forced to wait for patients, or their families, to bring money or even medical supplies, like bandages, before they can provide treatment.
