= Slow tourism =

Form of alternative tourism

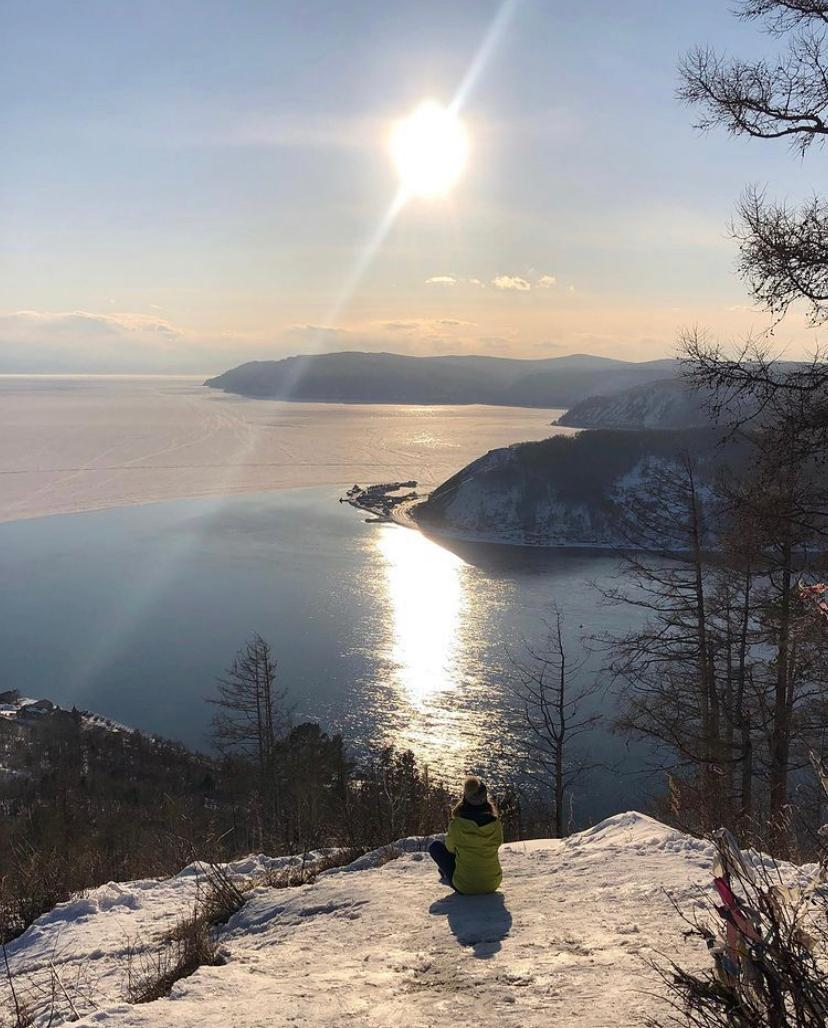
Slow tourism on Baikal Lake

Slow tourism is an alternative tourism choice in contrast to mass tourism. Slow tourism is a part of the sustainable tourism family, different from mainstream tourism and emphasizing the tourist’s greater personal awareness. It is characterized by reducing mobility and by taking time to explore local history and culture, while supporting the environment. The concept emerged from the Italian Slow Food movement and the Cittaslow movement.

== Principles ==
Robinson (2011) claims that central to the meaning and concept of slow tourism appears to be the shift in focus from achieving a quantity and volume of experiences while on holiday towards the quality of fewer and more meaningful experiences. A tourist experience could be defined as “slow” when the intention is to discover the particular characteristics of a place while respecting the locality and its inhabitants and to do so without falling into nostalgia for the past or into commercial kitsch. Slow tourists willingly slow down their pace in the interest of the environment and authentic experiences. Considerable dimensions for the definition of slow tourism are: slow transportation, slow places and slow food.

Dickinson and Lumsdon (2010) maintain that slow transportation should imply ‘unhurried’ travel, not bound by time schedules and strict sightseeing itineraries. Slow places refer to the slow cities that offer to slow tourists the possibility to focus on immersion in local life. Tourists may be accommodated with a host family so that they could learn through spending slow and leisurely time with the locals or they may opt for eco hotels. The activity component in any kind of slow tourism is more ‘knowledge and learning based’ rather than ‘fun based’, thereby slow tourism may also offer an intellectual experience because visitors can actively rethink modern life and the meaning of time.

Taking into account the dimensions highlighted above, Caffyn (2012) outlines the following principles of slow tourism:

- minimizing travel distance;
- maximizing the time available for the trip;
- relaxing the mind;
- eating at local restaurants;
- shopping in local markets or directly from producers;
- learning new skills;
- minimizing mechanization and technology;
- experiencing authenticity;
- minimizing carbon footprint.

The list is not exhaustive, but the more these elements are present, the slower a holiday might be judged.

== Development of the phenomenon ==
Slow tourism is an outgrowth of the slow movement which emerged from the slow food movement founded in Italy by Carlo Petrini in 1986. Slow tourism developed as a new form of tourism during the 1990s with the birth of the Cittaslow movement which has played a leading role in the development of slow tourism by providing certified alternative destinations to promote a slower pace and way of life. Slow tourism develops in different ways in different regions and cities and is more fully developed in countries with a high concentration of cittaslow designed cities.

In 2007 World Travel Market & Euromonitor identified slow tourism as a new trend for western Europe observing that the trend was spreading to the United States and Latin America. Slow tourism was forecasted to continue to grow in popularity, becoming an alternative to more traditional holidays and estimating a 10% compound annual growth rate.

== Motivation ==
“Motivation and goals of slow tourism” research discovered general slow tourism motivations: relaxation, self-reflection, escape, novelty seeking, engagement, and discovery. People engage in slow trips to seek novelty experience through new temporalities, new places, and new people that offer them sensations of thrills, adventures, and emotional stimulation.

The appreciation of local food and taste is central to the slow tourism experience and the food can be considered a pull factor. Cultural factors such as local culture and heritage also play a crucial role in motivation. Slow tourists have strong physical motivators, they avoid stress and noisy environments and focus on activities that engage body and spirit (e.g. hiking, cycling). A desire to detach oneself both physically and mentally from one’s daily routines and obligations may be a dominant travel motivation. Personal development is another motivator. By slowing down in the new physical and social context, the traveler may also want to identify self-status, gain insights into self, enhance feelings of self-growth, and experience authentic selfhood.

Yurtseven and Kaya (2011) identify three clusters of tourists visiting a tourist cittaslow destination: ‘dedicated’, ‘interested’ and ‘accidental’ slow tourists, while Smith (2012) and Dickinson, Robbins and Lumsdon (2010) call dedicated and environmentally motivated tourists ‘hard slow’ and others who enjoy aspects of slow tourism as ‘soft slow’.

== Mass vs. Slow tourism ==
Slow tourism is a response to negative aspects of mass tourism, giving real substance and content to the concept of tourism. It valorizes the authenticity of the experience at the destination while “fast” tourism involves visiting commercialized destinations within the time limits and does not provide the possibility of enjoying the destination. Moreover, mass tourism causes pressure on the human, natural, and cultural environment, and has a high ecological footprint.

== Typology of activities ==
In order to acquire cultural capital, slow tourists are willing to be participants in the preparation or production process, rather than being mere spectators.

Moira et al. state that slow tourists:

- visit cultural and religious monuments of the area or religious tourism;
- taste local delicacies, and are informed about their history and manufacturing techniques through culinary tourism;
- try local wines and drinks through enotourism;
- are informed or involved in agricultural activities and practice agritourism visiting farms,;
- visit local production units through industrial tourism;
- make trips to nature through ecotourism;
- hiking;
- biking;
- rafting in the lakes and rivers.

== Destinations ==
Sonia (2015) writes that the earliest slow cities emerged in Italy, having developed on the core value of self-sufficiency on local resources, and underlines that nowadays maintaining of cities as ‘slow’ is more likely in places where the development is already at a gradual pace, or else not possible, because of geographical or other limitations that make the pace of life slow in origin. Since slow tourism promotes short-haul travel using modes of transport other than the airplane, proximate markets are logical targets.

Examples of slow tourism destination are:

- Camino de Santiago (France, Spain);
- Lycian Way (Turkey);
- Tour du Mont Blanc (France, Italy, Switzerland);
- Marche (Italy);
- Pacific Crest Trail (USA);
- Continental Divide Trail (USA);
- Bibbulmun Track (Australia);
- Douro region (Portugal);
- Lakonia region https://el.wikipedia.org/wiki/%CE%A0%CE%BF%CE%BB%CF%8D%CE%B4%CF%81%CE%BF%CF%83%CE%BF_%CE%9B%CE%B1%CE%BA%CF%89%CE%BD%CE%AF%CE%B1%CF%82(Greece).

== See also ==
- Slow living
- Sustainable tourism
- Sustainable development
- Environmental protection
- Heritage tourism
