= Catharina Boehme =

Medical scientist

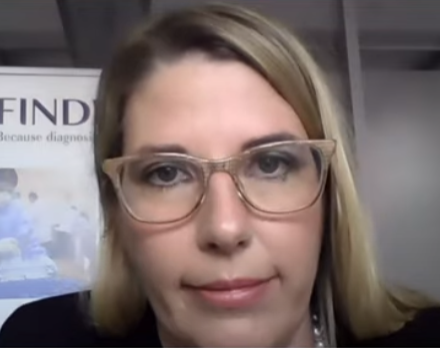
- Speaking at the 2021 World Economic Forum
- Education: LMU Munich; Charité; Heidelberg University
- Medical career
- Institutions: FIND; WHO

WHO Regional Director, SEARO
- Acting
- Assumed office 15 July 2025
- Preceded by: Saima Wazed

Assistant Director-General External Relations and Governance of WHO
- Incumbent
- Assumed office May 2023

Catharina Boehme is a global health leader, physician, and the Assistant Director-General for External Relations and Governance of the World Health Organization. She previously served as WHO Chef de Cabinet, and is known for her work in developing diagnostic tests for diseases such as tuberculosis and for advocating for increased testing for the COVID-19 disease. In July 2025, she was appointed as the acting WHO Regional Director for SEARO, in place of Saima Wazed, who was placed on indefinite leave.

== Early life and education ==
Boehme graduated with a Doctor of Medicine degree in 2002 in Internal Medicine from LMU Munich. She has diplomas in Public Health from Charité and in Management & Leadership from the International Institute for Management Development at Heidelberg University.

== Career ==
Early in her career, Boehme worked at the Department of Infectious and Tropical Diseases in Munich and established a tuberculosis diagnostic research unit in Tanzania.

Boehme became the chief executive officer of Foundation for Innovative New Diagnostics (FIND) in 2013. In this capacity, she worked on a collaboration with other partners within the Access to COVID-19 Tools Accelerator to make tests for COVID-19 more broadly available. In 2021 Boehme joined the World Health Organization as Chef de Cabinet to Director-General Tedros Adhanom Ghebreyesus.

== Research ==
Boehme's early research was on an enzyme within the parasite that causes malaria, and the development of new testing methods for the detection of tuberculosis. Boehme has written in Nature Medicine about the need for diagnostic testing as a means to prevent the spread of diseases such as COVID-19.

== Other activities ==
- World Health Summit (WHS), Member of the Steering Committee

== Selected publications ==
- Boehme, Catharina C.; Nabeta, Pamela; Hillemann, Doris; Nicol, Mark P.; Shenai, Shubhada; Krapp, Fiorella; Allen, Jenny; Tahirli, Rasim; Blakemore, Robert; Rustomjee, Roxana; Milovic, Ana (9 September 2010). "Rapid Molecular Detection of Tuberculosis and Rifampin Resistance". New England Journal of Medicine. 363 (11): 1005–1015. doi:10.1056/NEJMoa0907847. ISSN 0028-4793. PMC 2947799. PMID 20825313.
- Boehme, Catharina C; Nicol, Mark P; Nabeta, Pamela; Michael, Joy S; Gotuzzo, Eduardo; Tahirli, Rasim; Gler, Ma Tarcela; Blakemore, Robert; Worodria, William; Gray, Christen; Huang, Laurence (2011). "Feasibility, diagnostic accuracy, and effectiveness of decentralised use of the Xpert MTB/RIF test for diagnosis of tuberculosis and multidrug resistance: a multicentre implementation study". The Lancet. 377 (9776): 1495–1505. doi:10.1016/s0140-6736(11)60438-8. ISSN 0140-6736. PMC 3085933. PMID 21507477.
- Boehme, Catharina C.; Nabeta, Pamela; Henostroza, German; Raqib, Rubhana; Rahim, Zeaur; Gerhardt, Martina; Sanga, Erica; Hoelscher, Michael; Notomi, Tsugunori; Hase, Tetsu; Perkins, Mark D. (2007). "Operational Feasibility of Using Loop-Mediated Isothermal Amplification for Diagnosis of Pulmonary Tuberculosis in Microscopy Centers of Developing Countries". Journal of Clinical Microbiology. 45 (6): 1936–1940. doi:10.1128/JCM.02352-06. ISSN 0095-1137. PMC 1933042. PMID 17392443.
- Reid, Michael J A; Arinaminpathy, Nimalan; Bloom, Amy; Bloom, Barry R; Boehme, Catharina; Chaisson, Richard; Chin, Daniel P; Churchyard, Gavin; Cox, Helen; Ditiu, Lucica; Dybul, Mark (2019). "Building a tuberculosis-free world: The Lancet Commission on tuberculosis". The Lancet. 393 (10178): 1331–1384. doi:10.1016/s0140-6736(19)30024-8. hdl:1765/115959. ISSN 0140-6736. PMID 30904263. S2CID 84182624.
- Boehme, Catharina; Hannay, Emma; Sampath, Rangarajan (2021). "SARS-CoV-2 testing for public health use: core principles and considerations for defined use settings". The Lancet Global Health. 9 (3): e247–e249. doi:10.1016/s2214-109x(21)00006-1. ISSN 2214-109X. PMC 7906635. PMID 33516282.
