= Institute of Tropical Medicine Antwerp =

Biomedical research institute in Belgium

- Type: Public
- Established: 1906 in Brussels; 1931: moved to Antwerp
- Executive Director: Dr Özge Tunçalp
- Administrative staff: 450
- Postgraduates: 500
- Doctoral students: 120
- Location: Nationalestraat 155, 2000 Antwerp, Flanders, Belgium
- Campus: Urban
- Website: www.itg.be

The Institute of Tropical Medicine (Dutch: Instituut voor Tropische Geneeskunde, ITG; French: Institut de médecine tropicale, or IMT) is one of the world's leading institutes for training and research in tropical medicine and the organisation of health care in developing countries. Located in Antwerp, Belgium, ITM also delivers outpatient, clinical and preventive services in tropical pathologies and sexually transmitted diseases.

== Research ==
ITM has a strong reputation in biomedical, clinical and public health research, advanced education, travel medicine and care for HIV and sexually transmitted diseases as well as capacity-building in developing countries. Peter Piot and his colleagues at the institute were the first to demonstrate that AIDS was a tropical African disease. ITM has been recognized by the World Health Organization as a reference centre for AIDS research. ITM also is a national and international reference centre for a series of diseases and pathogens (such as the Ebola virus).

== Academics ==
At ITM, about 450 scientists and technicians do research on pathogens, patients and populations. Yearly, an average of 500 medical doctors, nurses and scientists follow advanced courses. About 120 young researchers are completing their PhD. Each year, the medical services handle around 35,000 consultations.

ITM also carries out an extensive capacity strengthening program in developing countries, and is part of a large network of institutions in Africa, South America and Asia.

== Departments ==
- Department of Biomedical Sciences
- Department of Clinical Sciences
- Department of Public Health

== See also ==
- Travel medicine
- UNAIDS
