= Peter Piot =

Belgian-British microbiologist (born 1949)

Professor Sir Peter Piot KCMG FRCP FFPH FMedSci
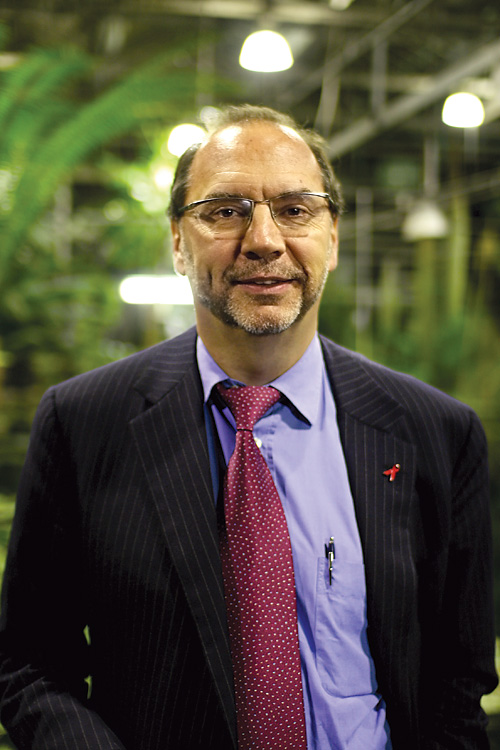
- Piot in 2006
- Born: Peter Karel Piot; 17 February 1949 (age 77)
- Education: Ghent University; University of Antwerp
- Spouse: Heidi Larson
- Awards: Calderone Prize (2003); Vlerick Award (2004); Flanders-America Award (2008); Prince Mahidol Award (2013); Prix International de l'INSERM (2015); John Dirks Canada Gairdner Global Health Award (2015); Manson Medal (2016)
- Scientific career
- Workplaces: London School of Hygiene & Tropical Medicine; Institute of Tropical Medicine Antwerp; Imperial College London
- Website: lshtm.ac.uk/aboutus/people/piot.peter

Sir Peter Karel, Baron Piot (born 17 February 1949) is a Belgian-British microbiologist known for his research into Ebola and AIDS.

After helping discover the Ebola virus in 1976 and leading efforts to contain the first-ever recorded Ebola epidemic that same year, Piot became a pioneering researcher into AIDS. He has held key positions in the United Nations and World Health Organization involving AIDS research and management. He has also served as a professor at several universities worldwide. He is the author of 16 books and over 600 scientific articles.

== Early life and education ==
Piot was born in Keerbergen, Belgium. His father was a civil servant who worked with agricultural exports, and his mother ran a construction company. Piot is the oldest of two brothers and a sister.

After studying physics in the School of Engineering and Physics at Ghent University, Piot changed to medicine. During medical school, Piot received a Diploma in Tropical Medicine (DTM) from the Institute of Tropical Medicine Antwerp in Antwerp. In 1974, he received an MD degree from Ghent University. In 1980, Piot received a PhD degree in clinical microbiology from the University of Antwerp.

== Career ==
In 1976, while working at the Institute of Tropical Medicine, Piot was part of a team that observed a Marburg-like virus in a sample of blood taken from a sick nun working in Zaire. Piot and his colleagues subsequently traveled to Zaire as part of an International Commission set up by the Government of Zaire to help quell the outbreak. The International Commission made key discoveries into how the virus spread, and traveled from village to village, spreading information and putting the ill and those who had come into contact with them into quarantine. The epidemic was already waning when the International Commission arrived, thanks to measures taken by local and national authorities, and it finally stopped in three months, after it had killed almost 300 people. The events were dramatised by Mike Walker on BBC Radio 4 in December 2014 in a production by David Morley. Piot narrated the programme.

Piot has received the majority of the credit for discovering Ebola, since in 1976, it was claimed he was the one to receive blood samples while working in a lab at the Institute for Tropical Medicine in Antwerp, Belgium. The samples were once claimed to be originally sent by Dr. Jean-Jacques Muyembe-Tamfum, a Congolese doctor who obtained the blood samples from those sickened with a mysterious disease in then-Zaire, later discovered to be Ebola. In 2012, Piot published a memoir entitled No Time to Lose which chronicles his professional work, including the discovery of the Ebolavirus; he mentions Muyembe in passing rather than as a co-discoverer. In a 2016 Journal of Infectious Disease article, co-signed by most of the actors from that first outbreak, including Peter Piot and Jean-Jacques Muyembe, the claims by both Piot and Muyembe to have played a significant role in the early discovery of Ebola have been refuted. Piot stated in 2019 that "my book was not an attempt to write the history of Ebola, but more my personal experience".

In the 1980s, Piot participated in collaborative projects in Burundi, Côte d'Ivoire, Kenya, Tanzania, and Zaire. Project SIDA in Kinshasa, Zaire was the first international project on AIDS in Africa and is widely acknowledged as having provided the foundations of science's understanding of HIV infection in Africa. He was a professor of microbiology, and of public health at the Prince Leopold Institute of Tropical Medicine, in Antwerp, and at the University of Nairobi, Vrije Universiteit Brussel, the Lausanne, and a visiting professor at the London School of Economics. He was also a senior fellow at the University of Washington in Seattle, a scholar in residence at the Ford Foundation, and a senior fellow at the Bill & Melinda Gates Foundation.

From 1991 to 1994, Piot was president of the International AIDS Society. In 1992, he became assistant director of the World Health Organization's Global Programme on HIV/AIDS. On 12 December 1994, he was appointed executive director of the Joint United Nations Programme on HIV/AIDS (UNAIDS) and Assistant-Secretary-General of the United Nations.

From 2009 to 2010, Piot served as director of the Institute for Global Health at Imperial College London.

=== London School of Hygiene & Tropical Medicine ===
In October 2010, Piot became the director of the London School of Hygiene & Tropical Medicine.

In addition to his work at LSHTM, Piot is a member of the Institute of Medicine of the National Academy of Sciences of the United States and the Royal Academy of Medicine of Belgium, a Fellow of the Royal College of Physicians of London, UK and a Fellow of the Academy of Medical Sciences. In 2011, Amy Gutmann appointed him to serve on the International Research Panel at the Presidential Commission for the Study of Bioethical Issues.

In 2014, in the face of an unprecedented Ebola epidemic in western Africa, Piot and other scientists called for the emergency release of the experimental ZMapp vaccine for use on humans before it had undergone clinical testing on humans. That year, he was appointed by Director General Margaret Chan to the World Health Organization's Advisory Group on the Ebola Virus Disease Response, co-chaired by Sam Zaramba and David L. Heymann. He also chaired an independent panel convened by Harvard Global Health Institute and the London School of Hygiene & Tropical Medicine into the national and international response to the epidemic, which sharply criticised the response of the WHO and put forward ten recommendations for the body's reorganisation. In February 2020, he criticised the delay in declaring the 2019–20 novel coronavirus outbreak focused on Hubei, China, a Public Health Emergency of International Concern, and advocated a five-point scale for outbreaks, rather the current binary (emergency/no emergency) system.

In 2020, Piot was appointed to the European Commission's advisory panel on COVID-19, co-chaired by Ursula von der Leyen and Stella Kyriakides. In the preparations for the Global Health Summit hosted by the European Commission and the G20 in May 2021, Piot co-chaired the event's High-Level Scientific Panel.

== Personal life ==
In May 2020, Piot disclosed that he had had COVID-19.

Piot is fluent in English, French, and Dutch. He is married to the American anthropologist Heidi Larson.

== Other activities ==
- Africa Europe Foundation (AEF), Member of the Strategy Group on Health (since 2020)
- Centre for International Health Protection (ZIG), Robert Koch Institute (RKI), member of the scientific advisory board (since 2020)
- Exemplars in Global Health, member of the senior advisory board (since 2020)
- Coalition for Epidemic Preparedness Innovations (CEPI), member of the board (since 2018)
- The Lancet Public Health, member of the editorial advisory board (since 2016)
- Africa Health Research Institute (AHRI), chair of the board of directors (since 2017)
- UK Collaborative on Development Research (UKCDR), chair of the Strategic Coherence of ODA-funded Research (since 2017)
- Africa Research Excellence Fund (AREF), member of the advisory panel (since 2015)
- Novartis Foundation, member of the board of trustees (since 2015)
- Antwerp Management School, member of the international advisory board
- Centre Virchow-Villermé, member of the international advisory board
- Global Health Corps, member of the board of advisors
- Global Health Innovative Technology Fund (GHIT), member of the board of directors
- The Lancet, member of the international advisory board
- University of Washington, External Member of the advisory board at the Department of Global Health
- World Health Summit, member of the council

== Awards ==
- 2003: Calderone Prize
- 2004: Vlerick Award
- 2008: America-Flanders Award
- 2013: Hideyo Noguchi Africa Prize
- 2013: Prince Mahidol Award
- 2015: Prix International de l'INSERM
- 2015: Canada Gairdner Global Health Award
- 2016: Manson Medal
- 2018: Member of the German Academy of Sciences Leopoldina.

== Honours ==
- Belgium:
  - Ennobled with the title of Baron for life in the Nobility of Belgium by King Albert II of Belgium (1995)
- Japan:
  - Grand Cordon of the Order of the Rising Sun (2018)
- Senegal:
  - Officer of the National Order of the Lion
- United Kingdom:
  - Honorary Knight Commander of the Order of St Michael and St George (2016)
  - Substantive Knight Commander of the Order of St Michael and St George (2019)
- Zaire:
  - Officer of the National Order of the Leopard (1976)

== Selected filmography ==
- 2002: Jonathan Dimbleby (TV series) – episode: "The AIDS Crisis in Africa"
- 2006: Frontline (TV series documentary) – episode: "The Age of AIDS"
- 2006: 60 Minutes (TV series documentary) – episode: "The New Space Race/Fighting AIDS/Immortality"
- 2009: House of Numbers: Anatomy of an Epidemic (Documentary)
- 2014: Horizon: Ebola: The Search for a Cure (TV series documentary)
- 2017: Heart of the Matter (documentary short)
- 2017: Unseen Enemy (documentary)

== Selected works and publications ==
=== Selected works ===
- Piot, Peter (2013). No Time to Lose: A Life in Pursuit of Deadly Viruses. New York; London: W.W. Norton. ISBN 978-0-393-08411-5. OCLC 916025971.
- Piot, Peter (2015). AIDS: Between Science and Politics. New York: Columbia University Press. ISBN 978-0-231-16626-3. OCLC 946549752.

=== Selected publications ===
- Pattyn, S.; Groen, G.vander; Jacob, W.; Piot, P.; Courteille, G. (March 1977). "Isolation of Marburg-like virus from a case of haemorrhagic fever in Zaire". The Lancet. 309 (8011): 573–574. doi:10.1016/S0140-6736(77)92002-5. PMID 65663. Wikidata ()
- Members of the International Commission (1978). "Ebola haemorrhagic fever in Zaire, 1976". Bulletin of the World Health Organization. 56 (2): 271–93. PMC 2395567. PMID 307456. Wikidata ()
- Cameron, D.William; D'Costa, LourdesJ; Maitha, GregoryM; Cheang, Mary; Piot, Peter; Simonsen, J.Neil; Ronald, AllanR; Gakinya, MichaelN; Ndinya-Achola, J.O; Brunham, RobertC; Plummer, FrancisA (August 1989). "Female to Male Transmission of Human Immunodeficiency Virus Type 1: Risk Factors for Seroconversion in Men". The Lancet. 334 (8660): 403–407. doi:10.1016/S0140-6736(89)90589-8. PMID 2569597. S2CID 7249443. Wikidata ()
- Piot, Peter; Bartos, Michael; Ghys, Peter D.; Walker, Neff; Schwartländer, Bernhard (April 2001). "The global impact of HIV/AIDS". Nature. 410 (6831): 968–973. Bibcode:2001Natur.410..968P. doi:10.1038/35073639. PMID 11309626. S2CID 4373421. Wikidata ()
- Piot, Peter (August 2006). "AIDS: from crisis management to sustained strategic response". The Lancet. 368 (9534): 526–530. doi:10.1016/S0140-6736(06)69161-7. PMID 16890840. Wikidata ()
- Beaglehole, Robert; Bonita, Ruth; Horton, Richard; Adams, Cary; Alleyne, George; Asaria, Perviz; Baugh, Vanessa; Bekedam, Henk; Billo, Nils; Casswell, Sally; Cecchini, Michele; Colagiuri, Ruth; Colagiuri, Stephen; Collins, Tea; Ebrahim, Shah; Engelgau, Michael; Galea, Gauden; Gaziano, Thomas; Geneau, Robert; Haines, Andy; Hospedales, James; Jha, Prabhat; Keeling, Ann; Leeder, Stephen; Lincoln, Paul; McKee, Martin; Mackay, Judith; Magnusson, Roger; Moodie, Rob; Mwatsama, Modi; Nishtar, Sania; Norrving, Bo; Patterson, David; Piot, Peter; Ralston, Johanna; Rani, Manju; Reddy, K Srinath; Sassi, Franco; Sheron, Nick; Stuckler, David; Suh, Il; Torode, Julie; Varghese, Cherian; Watt, Judith (April 2011). "Priority actions for the non-communicable disease crisis". The Lancet. 377 (9775): 1438–1447. doi:10.1016/S0140-6736(11)60393-0. PMID 21474174. Wikidata ()
- Breman, Joel G.; Heymann, David L.; Lloyd, Graham; McCormick, Joseph B.; Miatudila, Malonga; Murphy, Frederick A.; Muyembé-Tamfun, Jean-Jacques; Piot, Peter; Ruppol, Jean-François; Sureau, Pierre; van der Groen, Guido; Johnson, Karl M. (15 October 2016). "Discovery and Description of Ebola Zaire Virus in 1976 and Relevance to the West African Epidemic During 2013–2016". Journal of Infectious Diseases. 214 (suppl 3): S93–S101. doi:10.1093/INFDIS/JIW207. PMC 5050466. PMID 27357339. Wikidata ()
- Kelly-Cirino, Cassandra D; Nkengasong, John; Kettler, Hannah; Tongio, Isabelle; Gay-Andrieu, Françoise; Escadafal, Camille; Piot, Peter; Peeling, Rosanna W; Gadde, Renuka; Boehme, Catharina (February 2019). "Importance of diagnostics in epidemic and pandemic preparedness". BMJ Global Health. 4 (Suppl 2) e001179. doi:10.1136/BMJGH-2018-001179. PMC 6362765. PMID 30815287. Wikidata ()
- Bekker, Linda-Gail; Ratevosian, Jirair; Spencer, Julia; Piot, Peter; Beyrer, Chris (1 March 2019). "Governance for health: the HIV response and general global health". Bulletin of the World Health Organization. 97 (3): 170–170A. doi:10.2471/BLT.19.230417. PMC 6453319. PMID 30992627. Wikidata ()
- Dwyer-Lindgren, Laura; Cork, Michael A.; Sligar, Amber; Steuben, Krista M.; Wilson, Kate F.; Provost, Naomi R.; Mayala, Benjamin K.; VanderHeide, John D.; Collison, Michael L.; Hall, Jason B.; Biehl, Molly H.; Carter, Austin; Frank, Tahvi; Douwes-Schultz, Dirk; Burstein, Roy; Casey, Daniel C.; Deshpande, Aniruddha; Earl, Lucas; El Bcheraoui, Charbel; Farag, Tamer H.; Henry, Nathaniel J.; Kinyoki, Damaris; Marczak, Laurie B.; Nixon, Molly R.; Osgood-Zimmerman, Aaron; Pigott, David; Reiner, Robert C.; Ross, Jennifer M.; Schaeffer, Lauren E.; Smith, David L.; Davis Weaver, Nicole; Wiens, Kirsten E.; Eaton, Jeffrey W.; Justman, Jessica E.; Opio, Alex; Sartorius, Benn; Tanser, Frank; Wabiri, Njeri; Piot, Peter; Murray, Christopher J. L.; Hay, Simon I. (15 May 2019). "Mapping HIV prevalence in sub-Saharan Africa between 2000 and 2017". Nature. 570 (7760): 189–193. Bibcode:2019Natur.570..189D. doi:10.1038/S41586-019-1200-9. PMC 6601349. PMID 31092927. Wikidata ()
- Piot, Peter; Soka, Moses J; Spencer, Julia (September 2019). "Emergent threats: lessons learnt from Ebola" (PDF). International Health. 11 (5): 334–337. doi:10.1093/INTHEALTH/IHZ062. PMID 31385587. Wikidata ()
- Bausch, Daniel G; Piot, Peter (11 October 2019). "Ebola Vaccines: Biomedical Advances, Human Rights Challenges". The Journal of Infectious Diseases. 222 (4): 521–524. doi:10.1093/INFDIS/JIZ520. PMID 31603195. Wikidata ()
