= 2025 in the United Kingdom =

Events from the year 2025 in the United Kingdom.

== Incumbents ==
- Monarch – Charles III
- Prime Minister – Keir Starmer (Labour)

== Events ==
=== Year long ===
- Railway 200

=== January ===
- 1 January
  - 2025 United Kingdom floods: More than 100 flood warnings are issued after heavy rain affects parts of the UK. A major incident is declared in Greater Manchester after some homes are left without running water and people are rescued from cars in floodwater.
  - The cap on bus fares in England rises by 50% from £2 to £3 per journey.
  - The standard rate of VAT is added to private school fees.
  - The Energy Price Cap rises by an average of £21 per year, increasing the average annual gas and electricity bill to £1,738.
  - Home Office figures show 36,816 people crossed the English Channel in small boats throughout 2024, an increase from 2023, but fewer than 2022.
  - Bradford begins its year as UK City of Culture.
- 2 January
  - A man who was among four people injured when they were hit by a car in central London on Christmas Day dies in hospital.
  - The UK government announces that people smugglers will face social media blackouts, travel bans and telephone restrictions.
  - The biggest dinosaur fossil trackway ever found in the UK is reported at a quarry in Oxfordshire, consisting of 200 huge footprints made 166 million years ago in the mid-Jurassic period.
- 3 January
  - Temperatures are reported to have plunged to as low as −8 °C (17.6 °F) overnight, with amber cold weather alerts in place for the whole of England. Yellow weather warnings for snow and ice are in place for most of England, Wales, and Scotland between Saturday 4 January and Monday 6 January.
  - NHS chiefs in England warn of a major rise in flu cases.
  - The Foreign and Commonwealth Office confirms that a British woman, named as Greta Marie Otteson, has been found dead in a villa in Vietnam along with her fiancé, South African Els Arno Quinton.
  - At the age of 17, Luke Littler becomes the youngest World Darts Champion after defeating Michael van Gerwen 7–3 in the final.
- 4 January – The Foreign and Commonwealth Office reports the death of a Briton, 31-year-old Edward Pettifer, in the recent New Orleans truck attack.
- 5 January – Heavy snow causes travel disruption across the UK, as weather warnings remain in place. Temperatures are reported to have fallen to as low as −11 °C overnight in Loch Glascarnoch, Scotland.
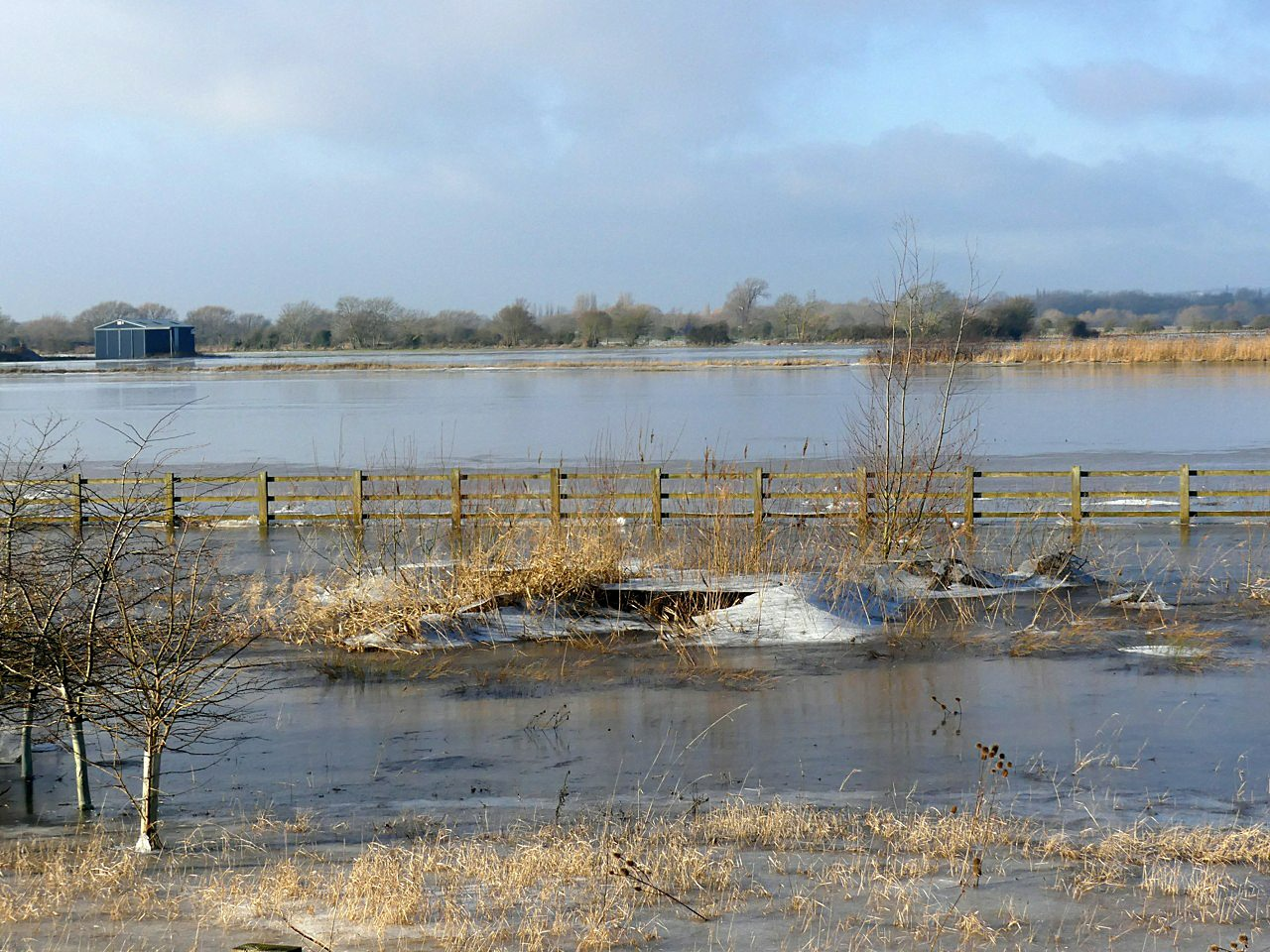
- River Trent floods at Barton in Fabis
  6 January
  - The government scraps a plan to phase out gas boilers in UK homes by 2035.
  - 2025 United Kingdom floods:
    - Dozens of people are rescued amid disruption from snow, ice, and flooding around much of the country. An overnight low of −13.3 °C (8 °F) is recorded, again in Loch Glascarnoch.
    - A major incident is declared in Leicestershire and Rutland, where 59 people are rescued from flood water.
  - The Prime Minister responds to X owner Elon Musk and others he accuses of "spreading lies and misinformation" over grooming gangs. Starmer tells reporters that these online debates have now "crossed a line", resulting in threats against MPs, including Safeguarding Minister Jess Phillips.
- 7 January
  - A search-and-rescue operation is launched in northern Italy's Dolomite Mountains for two British hikers, named as Aziz Ziriat and Samuel Harris, who have been missing since 1 January.
  - Alistair Macrow, chief executive of McDonald's in the UK, tells MPs the company has dismissed 29 employees because of sexual harassment over the past twelve months.
- 8 January
  - UK government borrowing rises to its highest level since the 2008 financial crisis.
  - A UK inquest into the death of singer Liam Payne opens, and hears that he died as a result of "polytrauma".
  - The UK government freezes the UK assets of the extreme-right wing group Blood and Honour, making it the first extremist group to be subject to UK financial sanctions.
  - Italy's mountain rescue service confirms the discovery of a body, which it believes to be that of Sam Harris, one of two missing British hikers.
- 9 January
  - The pound dips to a 14-month low, amid concerns over government borrowing.
  - As low temperatures continue to affect the UK, a fresh weather warning is issued for ice covering Northern Ireland, Wales and parts of England.
- 10 January
  - The UK records its coldest temperatures of the winter so far, with an overnight low of −14.5 °C (5.9 °F) in Altnaharra, northern Scotland.
  - Royal Mail launches a set of special stamps to celebrate award-winning sitcom The Vicar of Dibley.
  - The Homeland Security Group, a directorate of the Home Office, are reported to be monitoring social media posts by Elon Musk and others as a possible national security risk, assessing their reach and who is interacting with them.
  - UK gas network operator National Gas announces that the UK has enough gas to meet winter demand after Centrica (owners of British Gas) warned about "concerningly low" storage levels.
  - Pop star Chappell Roan wins BBC Radio 1's Sound of 2025.
  - The opening ceremony for the start of Bradford's tenure as UK City of Culture takes place in the city's City Park.
- 11 January – Temperatures continue to fall, becoming the coldest since 2010, with an overnight low of −18.9 °C in Roybridge, Scotland.
- 13 January
  - The Royal Mint announces a new £2 coin to commemorate Nineteen Eighty-Four author George Orwell on the 75th anniversary of his death.
  - Prime Minister Keir Starmer announces the AI Opportunities Action Plan, a strategy for using artificial intelligence (AI) across the UK to boost growth and deliver public services more efficiently. He tells reporters that AI "will drive incredible change" and pledges to make the UK a world leader in the technology.
  - Pound sterling falls to its lowest value against the US dollar since November 2023, with £1 worth $1.21.
  - Following the 2024 case of Excel Parking v Hudson in which a woman was taken to court for £2,000 worth of parking fines that were accrued because she could not find a phone signal to pay parking charges through an app within an allotted time, the private parking industry announces plans to update its rules to prevent motorists being fined if they do not pay to park within five minutes.
  - Two women from climate protest group Just Stop Oil are arrested after spray-painting over the grave of Charles Darwin inside Westminster Abbey.
  - Former boxing world heavyweight champion Tyson Fury announces his retirement from the sport, the second time he has done so.
- 14 January
  - Amazon announces the purchase of nearly 150 electric heavy goods vehicles to decarbonise its operations, the largest ever order of electric trucks in the UK.
  - The UK bans cattle, pigs, and sheep imports from Germany after a case of foot-and-mouth disease is confirmed in the country.
  - Tulip Siddiq resigns as Economic Secretary to the Treasury, over a scandal linked to the ousted government of Bangladesh. She becomes the second minister to resign from the Starmer ministry since the general election of July 2024.
  - The Princess of Wales visits staff and patients at the Royal Marsden Hospital, where she was treated following her cancer diagnosis, and reveals that she is now in remission from the illness.
  - Games Workshop is reported to be planning a fourth factory, amid booming sales of its wargame franchise, now with a total valuation of £4.2 billion.
- 15 January
  - UK inflation is reported to have fallen from 2.6% in November to 2.5% in December.
  - UK COVID-19 Inquiry: Kate Scott from the group Vaccine Injured and Bereaved UK tells the inquiry that the families of those adversely affected by COVID-19 vaccines had to support each other during the pandemic because there was no other help.
- 16 January
  - Office for National Statistics figures show the UK economy grew by 0.1% in November, a smaller than expected increase fuelled by hospitality and construction.
  - Home Secretary Yvette Cooper announces an inquiry into grooming gangs.
  - The father and stepmother of Sara Sharif are to seek an appeal against their conviction for her murder.
  - A record £410 million in government funding for fusion power is announced. This will include a prototype power plant in Nottinghamshire, targeted for completion by 2040, and repurposing a machine at the Culham Centre for Fusion Energy in Oxfordshire.
- 17 January
  - The International Monetary Fund upgrades its growth forecast for the UK, but warns of the potential impact of US President-elect Donald Trump's economic plans.
  - Keir Starmer pays a visit to Auschwitz concentration camp, and says he is determined to fight the "poison" of antisemitism.
  - A BBC investigation finds that the deaths of at least 56 babies, and two mothers, over a five-year period at the Leeds Teaching Hospitals NHS Trust may have been preventable.
- 18 January
  - The Department for Environment, Food and Rural Affairs confirms outbreaks of bird flu have been found in poultry at two farms in East Yorkshire and Lincolnshire, and that the birds will be humanely culled.
  - A plan is announced for digital driving licences to be introduced across the UK later in the year, accessible via a new government smartphone app, which could also be used as a form of ID when buying alcohol, voting, or boarding domestic flights.
  - Protests against Donald Trump: Women's March protests are held in Manchester, Liverpool, Plymouth, and other cities in the UK.
  - Gaza war protests: Nearly 80 pro-Palestine protesters in Whitehall are arrested for breaching protest conditions, with some allegedly breaking through police lines.
  - Buckingham Palace releases a new portrait of Sophie, Duchess of Edinburgh to coincide with her 60th birthday; the picture is taken by fashion photographer Christina Ebenezer.
- 20 January
  - The trial begins of Axel Rudakubana, 18, who pleaded guilty to murdering three girls in a knife attack at a Taylor Swift-themed dance class in Southport, which triggered riots around the UK in July and August 2024.
  - Home Secretary Yvette Cooper announces that an inquiry will be held into the Southport attack.
  - The Solicitor General refers the sentence of Urfan Sharif, convicted of the murder of his daughter, Sara, to the Court of Appeal for being "unduly leniant".
- 21 January
  - The husband of Pauline Quirke, star of TV sitcom Birds of a Feather, announces that the actress was diagnosed with dementia in 2021 and has retired from all professional and commercial duties.
  - The Met Office issues a yellow weather warning ahead of Storm Éowyn, which is expected to bring gusts of up to 90 mph (145 km/h) across large parts of the UK on Friday and Saturday.
  - In a speech from Downing Street following the announcement of a public inquiry into the Southport attack, the Prime Minister warns that the UK faces a "new and dangerous threat" from extreme violence.
- 22 January
  - Princess Beatrice gives birth to her second child, a daughter named Athena, at the Chelsea and Westminster Hospital in London.
  - UK government borrowing unexpectedly increased to £17.8bn in December, an increase of £10.1bn from December 2023, and its highest level for four years.
  - The owner of The Sun newspaper offers a "full and unequivocal apology" to Prince Harry for "serious intrusion" into his private life, and agrees to pay him "substantial damages".
  - The warning level for Storm Éowyn is increased from yellow to amber, meaning an increased likelihood of severely or extremely bad weather.
  - Defence secretary John Healey tells MPs that the Royal Navy has been monitoring a Russian spy ship after it entered British waters earlier in the week.
- 23 January
  - A survey carried out by the British Retail Consortium indicates public expectation for the UK economy for the next three months has fallen to a "new low".
  - Red warnings are issued for Northern Ireland and parts of Scotland ahead of Storm Éowyn's expected arrival the following day.
  - The UK Emergency Alert System is used to warn several million people of a possible threat to life from the storm.
  - Sainsbury's supermarket announces it will cut 3,000 jobs as it shuts down its remaining cafés and closes its patisserie and pizza counters.
  - A large-scale outage of AI tool ChatGPT is reported.
  - Axel Rudakubana is sentenced at Liverpool Crown Court to a minimum term of 52 years in prison for the mass stabbing in Southport. His sentence is the second-longest minimum term in British legal history, after that of Hashem Abedi.
- 24 January
  - The Attorney General confirms that the 52-year minimum prison sentence given to Axel Rudakubana will be reviewed as unduly lenient.
  - A record increase in the number of UK businesses in critical financial distress is reported.
  - Storm Éowyn, described as a "once in a generation" weather event, hits the UK and Ireland. Over a million people are left without power across both countries, including 275,000 in the UK, with gusts of up to 100 mph (161 km/h) recorded in Scotland.
  - The Ministry of Defence signs a £9bn contract with Rolls Royce for the supply of nuclear submarine reactors.
- 25 January
  - The Met Office confirms that Storm Éowyn was "probably the strongest storm" to hit the UK in at least 10 years, with wind gusts in excess of 100 mph (160 km/h), and a million properties without power at its peak.
  - WH Smith announces that it is in talks to sell its high street outlets.
  - The British Museum is partially closed after an alleged IT attack by a former employee.
  - Buckingham Palace releases a new portrait of King Charles III dressed in a tartan kilt at Balmoral Castle to mark Burns Day.
- 26 January
  - A yellow weather warning for high winds and heavy rain is in place for parts of the UK as Storm Herminia makes landfall.
  - Prime Minister Keir Starmer holds his first transatlantic call with US President Donald Trump, during which Trump praises Starmer for doing "a good job thus far" and Starmer praises Trump's "role in securing the landmark ceasefire and hostages deal in Gaza".
- 27 January
  - Storm Herminia: A major incident is declared in Somerset after heavy rain brings flooding to the area.
  - The Royal Navy announces it is changing the name of a new submarine from HMS Agincourt to HMS Achilles.
  - Two members of the environmentalist protest group Just Stop Oil are arrested after disrupting a performance of The Tempest at London's Theatre Royal Drury Lane by climbing on stage.
- 28 January
  - The driver involved in the Wimbledon school crash of July 2023 is arrested for a second time, as police reopen an investigation into the incident, which killed two eight-year-old girls and injured 14 other people.
  - Dr Andrew Green, the British Medical Association's ethics chief, tells MPs that doctors must be able to opt-out of offering assisted dying.
  - The Office for National Statistics (ONS) releases a newly updated forecast of the UK population, projecting that it will grow by 7.3% to reach 72.5 million by 2032.
  - Home Office minister Dan Jarvis confirms the UK government has no plans to expand the definition of extremism to include violent environmentalism and misogynism after a think tank suggested the definition could be broadened.
- 29 January
  - Chancellor Rachel Reeves confirms that the government backs a third runway for Heathrow Airport, during a major speech on economic growth, saying the project is "badly needed" and could create 100,000 jobs. Critics including the Green Party and London Mayor Sadiq Khan point to the increased carbon emissions it would produce.
  - BBC News reports that Russian oligarch Roman Abramovich, who is subject to UK sanctions, could owe the Inland Revenue as much as £1bn in taxes as a result of a mishandled attempt to avoid paying tax on hedge fund investments.
  - A High Court clears retailer Lidl to open its first in-store pub, to be situated in Dundonald, County Down, after rejecting a legal challenge to the plans from another trader.
- 30 January
  - The Right Reverend Dr John Perumbalath resigns as Bishop of Liverpool following allegations of sexual misconduct.
  - The Home Office announces that a new crime of endangering lives at sea, carrying a term of five years in prison, will be introduced as part of legislation to deal with people smuggling.
- 31 January
  - The UK government reverses visa changes introduced in February 2024 that stopped Ukrainians from bringing their children to the UK, meaning they can now do so.
  - Pharmaceutical manufacturer AstraZeneca abandons a planned £450m investment in a vaccine production facility on Merseyside, blaming a lack of UK government support for its decision.
  - The bodies of two women are found in the River Dee, Aberdeenshire, during the search for two missing 32-year-old sisters, Henrietta and Eliza Huszti, last seen on 7 January.
  - An IT problem prevents Barclays Bank customers from making essential online transactions.

=== February ===
- 1 February – The Home Office announces that four new laws will be introduced in order to tackle the threat of child sexual abuse images generated by artificial intelligence.
- 3 February
  - Nurse Sandie Peggie starts to give evidence at an employment tribunal into her claims that being forced to change in the same changing room as a doctor who was born male but self-identified as female amounted to harassment under the Equality Act.
  - First Minister John Swinney says there will be no ban on cats in Scotland after the Scottish Animal Welfare Commission suggested restricting them in some areas because of a potential "significant risk to wildlife populations".
  - Daniel Khalife is sentenced to 14 years and three months in prison after spying for Iran and escaping from HMP Wandsworth.
  - Changes to the management of people convicted of coercive or controlling behaviour come into force, putting the crime on the same level as domestic abuse. Those convicted of the offences and sentenced to twelve months or more in prison are now automatically managed under multi-agency public protection arrangements.
- 4 February
  - Increases in council tax above the usual limit of 5% are allowed to go ahead for six areas of England, including a 10% rise for Bradford.
  - A panel of international medical experts finds that Lucy Letby did not kill any babies after reviewing evidence against her.
  - Mumsnet says it has stopped users from sharing pictures after the parenting website was targeted with images of child sexual abuse.
- 5 February
  - Deputy Prime Minister Angela Rayner tells a meeting of local residents that Grenfell Tower, where a fire killed 72 people in 2017, will be dismantled to ground level.
  - Deputy Prime Minister Angela Rayner confirms that local elections in East Sussex, West Sussex, Essex, Thurrock, Hampshire, the Isle of Wight, Norfolk, Suffolk and Surrey will be delayed for a year to allow major local government reorganisations to take place.
  - 2024 Southport stabbings: A government review finds that the Prevent counter-terrorism scheme "prematurely" closed its case on Axel Rudakubana three years before he committed the attack in Southport.
- 6 February
  - The Bank of England cuts interest rates from 4.75% to 4.5%, the lowest base rate since June 2023. The Bank also cuts its growth forecast for the UK economy in 2025 from 1.5% to 0.75%.
  - A Russian diplomat is expelled from the UK in response to the 2024 expulsion of a British diplomat from Russia.
  - The UK government announces that landlords in England will be required to investigate and fix instances of damp and mould in social housing within a strict timescale from October 2025.
- 7 February
  - The UK government confirms that Grenfell Tower will be taken down, with the process taking place gradually and sensitively over the next two years, but the outward appearance of the building will not change until after the eighth anniversary of the fire in June.
  - The Home Office serves Apple Inc. with notice under the Investigatory Powers Act demanding access to encrypted data stored by Apple users in its iCloud service.
  - French police are investigating the deaths of a British couple, named as Andrew and Dawn Searle, who were found dead at their home in south west France. On 3 April it is announced that the deaths are being treated as a murder-suicide.
  - As the UK enters another period of cold weather, the UK Health Security Agency issues a yellow cold-health alert for parts of northern and eastern England, valid from 7 to 11 February.
  - The railway line between Liverpool Lime Street and Manchester Piccadilly is closed for most of the day after a car driven by a suspected drink driver crashes onto the track.
  - The UK is among 79 signatories to a joint statement condemning US President Donald Trump's executive order sanctioning the International Criminal Court (ICC).
  - Pets at Home becomes the world's first retailer to sell cultivated meat for dogs.
- 8 February – Health Minister Andrew Gwynne is sacked and suspended from the Labour Party over a string of offensive and abusive WhatsApp messages, in which he insulted constituents, fellow MPs and councillors.
- 9 February – Writing in The Sunday Times, M&S chief executive Stuart Machin says the retail sector is being "raided like a piggy bank" as it faces increased National Insurance contributions and other financial pressures.
- 10 February
  - A second Labour MP, Oliver Ryan, is suspended over offensive WhatsApp messages.
  - BBC News reports that Kim Leadbeater, the MP sponsoring the Terminally Ill Adults (End of Life) Bill, is to suggest replacing the High Court as the body making the final decision on assisted dying cases with a panel of experts who would oversee applications. Leadbetter confirms the plans the following day, saying it would strengthen the legislation. Opponents say it would water down the bill's safeguards.
- 11 February
  - Sir Mark Rowley, the Commissioner of the Metropolitan Police, says that policing has been left in a "hopeless position" following a High Court ruling that an officer accused of rape could not be dismissed from the force because the process was fundamentally unfair.
  - The General Synod, the governing body of the Church of England, rejects a fully-independent safeguarding model to deal with abuse cases, but instead adopts an alternative short-term proposal.
- 12 February
  - The UK government announces changes to rules regarding refugees, making it virtually impossible for anyone entering the country illegally to be granted citizenship.
  - The Prime Minister announces a judge-led inquiry into the 2023 Nottingham attacks, which he says will begin within weeks.
  - A review into the events leading up to the murder of David Amess finds that his killer, Ali Harbi Ali, was exited from the government's Prevent anti-terror programme "too quickly" and that its handling of him was "sub-optimal".
  - BBC News reports that MI5 lied to three courts while defending its handling of a misogynistic neo-Nazi agent who attacked his girlfriend with a machete.
- 13 February
  - Office for National Statistics data indicates the UK economy grew by 0.1% between October and December 2024, largely as a result of the construction and service industries, and surprising forecasters who had expected no growth.
  - The Foreign Office confirms that two British nationals have been arrested in Iran.
  - A BBC News investigation discovers Chancellor Rachel Reeves was the subject of an expenses investigation while she was a senior manager at Halifax Bank of Scotland in the late 2000s. Her online CV is also reported to have exaggerated the length of time she was employed by the Bank of England. In response, Reeves says that no concerns were raised with her at the time of the investigation.
  - Labour MP Kevin McKenna announces in the House of Commons that he is living with HIV.
- 14 February
  - The Attorney General for England and Wales rejects calls for the Court of Appeal to review the length of Southport murderer Axel Rudakubana's sentence.
  - Drivers working for Uber, Bolt and Addison Lee who belong to the Independent Workers' Union of Great Britain stage a six-hour strike for better pay and conditions.
- 15 February
  - Two Britons held in Iran are named as Craig and Lindsay Foreman; they were held in January while travelling through the country as part of a motorcycle trip around the world.
  - A technical problem leaves several thousand BT customers temporarily unable to access their email accounts.
- 16 February – Prime Minister Keir Starmer says he is "ready and willing" to put UK troops on the ground in Ukraine to protect peace.
- 18 February
  - Office for National Statistics data shows that average wages increased by 3.4% between October and December 2024, when compared to the same period in 2023.
  - The financially troubled Thames Water secures a £3bn emergency loan after winning a case in the High Court, and preventing the company from coming under public sector ownership.
  - Iran's Judiciary confirms that British couple Craig and Lindsay Foreman have been charged with espionage.
  - Consultancy firm Cornwall Insight forecasts that energy bills will increase by 5% from April, adding an average of £85 to the annual domestic fuel bill.
  - A 66-year-old woman is charged with manslaughter by scalding a five-year-old in a hot bath in 1978, nearly 50 years ago.
- 19 February
  - Inflation jumps from 2.5% to 3%, the highest level in 10 months.
  - A major incident is declared in Godstone, Surrey, after two sinkholes open up on a street, prompting the evacuation of local residents.
  - The UK government announces plans for tougher rules for selling knives online and stricter penalties for those who break the new rules.
  - Starmer expresses support for Ukrainian president Volodymyr Zelenskyy as a "democratically elected leader" after US President Donald Trump describes Zelenskyy as a "dictator".
  - British journalist Charlotte Peet is reported missing in Brazil, having last contacted a friend on 8 February.
  - Data published by Tell Mama indicates that instances of anti-Muslim hate are at a record high, with almost 6,000 cases recorded in 2024.
  - A team of archaeologists made up of British and Egyptian experts announce the discovery of the tomb of King Thutmose II in the Western Valleys of the Theban Necropolis near Luxor, the first British-led team to discover a pharaoh's tomb in more than a century.
- 20 February
  - Sir Nick Carter, the former Chief of the Defence Staff, suggests that European nations may need to offer reliable security guarantees to Ukraine in the event of a peace deal with Russia if the US will not.
  - Data from NHS England indicates a record number of hospital cases of norovirus, with 1,160 people a day in hospital with the bug, double the amount for the same time last winter.
  - The Foreign Office confirms that a British tourist has been killed while hiking in the Himalayas with a friend.
  - Reform UK leader Nigel Farage, seen as a key ally of Donald Trump, says that Ukrainian president Zelenskyy is not a dictator after initially suggesting that Trump's words should be taken seriously.
  - Barbara Broccoli and Michael G Wilson announce they are stepping down from control of the James Bond franchise, with creative control going to Amazon MGM Studios.
  - An inquest into the death of Royal Artillery Gunner Jaysley Beck, who was found hanged in her barracks at Larkhill Camp in Wiltshire in December 2021, rules her death was caused, in part, by the British Army's handling of her complaint against a senior officer, who had sexually assaulted her.
- 21 February
  - Records show a surplus in public finances of £15.4bn in January, the highest level for the month since records began more than three decades ago, but lower than the £20.5bn forecast by experts.
  - A pilot scheme involving five police forces – West Midlands, Northumbria, Northamptonshire, Bedfordshire and Humberside – will see domestic violence specialists embedded in the forces' 999 emergency control rooms.
  - London St Pancras Highspeed and Getlink sign an agreement that will help them to commit to expanding rail connectivity between the UK and Europe, with routes to France, Switzerland and Germany.
  - Apple takes the unprecedented step of removing Advanced Data Protection from UK customers after the UK government demanded access to user data.
- 22 February
  - In a call with Zelenskyy, Starmer assures the Ukraine President he will emphasise the importance of Ukraine's sovereignty during his forthcoming meeting with Trump.
  - Ofgem warns gas and electricity suppliers they will be fined if they continue to send out "back bills" to customers.
  - BMW confirms it is delaying the reintroduction of electric vehicle production at its Oxford Mini plant because of multiple uncertainties facing the automotive industry.
- 23 February – A British couple in their 70s, named as Peter and Barbie Reynolds, have been detained by the Taliban in Afghanistan, The Sunday Times reports, having been arrested for an unspecified reason on 1 February.
- 24 February
  - The UK and India restart trade negotiations a year after pausing them ahead of general elections in both countries.
  - Labour MP Mike Amesbury is sentenced to 10 weeks in prison after he admitted punching a man in his Cheshire constituency the previous year. He subsequently resigned as an MP in March.
- 25 February
  - In the Commons, Starmer commits to boosting the UK's defence spending from 2.3% to 2.5% of GDP by 2027, funded by cuts to international aid. He also announces a further planned increase to 3% during the next parliament.
  - Ofgem announces a 6.4% increase in the Energy Price Cap from April, meaning a typical household's gas and electricity will increase by £111 a year, or £9.25 a month, to £1,849.
  - The Church of England announces that disciplinary proceedings will be initiated against 10 members of its clergy, including former Archbishop of Canterbury George Carey, following a review of evidence in the report into the case of John Smyth.
- 26 February
  - The Seventh Carbon Budget is published by the Climate Change Committee, covering the period from 2038 to 2042. Among other measures, it recommends that four in five cars should be electric and half of all homes should have heat pumps installed within 15 years.
  - The UK government says that seven organisations criticised in the wake of the Grenfell Tower fire will face investigation and could be banned from bidding for public contracts.
- 27 February
  - Bumblebees are reported to have fallen to their lowest numbers on record, declining by almost a quarter in 2024 compared to the 2010–2023 average.
  - Labour MP Mike Amesbury's prison sentence is suspended following an appeal.
  - UK asylum claims hit their highest level since 1979, increasing by 18% year-on-year to reach over 108,000.
  - Transport Secretary Heidi Alexander announces that she is "minded to approve" a second runway at Gatwick Airport. Some MPs, local authorities and residents are strongly opposed.
  - Starmer meets with US President Donald Trump at the White House for talks on Ukraine and defence.
  - A review into the UK porn industry conducted by Baroness Gabby Bertin recommends giving Ofcom powers to police porn sites deemed to contain "harmful" material.
  - Office for National Statistics data indicates that 987,000 16 to 24-year-olds were not in work, education or training at the end of 2024, the highest number since 2013.
  - The BBC launches an internal review after pulling the documentary Gaza: How to Survive a Warzone from iPlayer due to the revelation that the 13-year-old narrator, Abdullah, was the son of a Hamas official.
- 28 February
  - International Development Minister Anneliese Dodds resigns over the prime minister's cuts to the foreign aid budget, saying the UK's reputation will be deeply harmed.
  - Technical issues affect apps operated by Lloyds Bank, TSB, Halifax Bank and Bank of Scotland.
  - The BBC issues an apology for the Gaza documentary, admitting "serious flaws" and confirming that it would not be broadcast again. Culture Secretary Lisa Nandy calls for a comprehensive review of the incident and demands that the BBC ensure full transparency in its findings.

=== March ===
- 1 March – Prime Minister Keir Starmer and Ukrainian president Volodymyr Zelenskyy meet for talks at 10 Downing Street following Zelensky's visit to Washington the previous day.
- 2 March
  - Starmer convenes a summit in London with European leaders, including Zelenskyy, along with Canadian PM Justin Trudeau, to discuss support for Ukraine. He says that Europe is facing a "once in a generation" moment for security.
  - Following the summit, Volodymyr Zelenskyy meets King Charles III at Sandringham.
- 3 March – Starmer announces a £1.6bn missile deal for Ukraine following the previous day's summit.
- 4 March
  - Conservative MP Graham Stuart, a former Foreign Office minister, warns that the UK should "consider the possibility that President Trump is a Russian asset."
  - Deputy Prime Minister Angela Rayner says the UK will not be "derailed" from working to end the war in Ukraine after the US paused military aide to the country.
  - UK opposition politicians have accused US Vice President JD Vance of disrespecting British forces after he said a US stake in Ukraine's economy would be a "better security guarantee than 20,000 troops from some random country that hasn't fought a war in 30 or 40 years".
  - Boots recalls 500 mg packs of paracetamol tablets over a mislabelling error that incorrectly identified them as aspirin.
  - BBC News reports on the case of Kasibba, an autistic woman who spent 45 years in a mental hospital.
  - Investment firm Aberdeen Group plc is to drop its Abrdn rebrand which was widely mocked, and be known instead as aberdeen group.
  - The UK government says it will not pay Rwanda any further money for the scrapped asylum plan.
- 5 March
  - Following a trial at Inner London Crown Court, Chinese PhD student Zhenhao Zou is convicted of drugging and raping ten women, but police suspect he may have attacked as many as 50 victims, potentially making him one of the UK's most prolific sexual predators. He is sentenced on 19 June.
  - The Royal Navy releases footage of the Russian warship Boikiy, which was tracked near British territorial waters.
  - Four former British ambassadors to the United States – Sir Peter Westmacott, Dame Karen Pierce, Sir Nigel Sheinwald and Sir David Manning – express their concern about the future of intelligence sharing with the US following the re-election of Donald Trump.
  - Starmer pays tribute to UK troops who fought in Iraq and Afghanistan after US Vice President Vance was accused of disrespecting British troops.
  - The UK's four Football Associations announce their intention to submit a joint bid to host the 2035 FIFA Women's World Cup.
- 6 March – Valerii Zaluzhnyi, Ukraine's ambassador to the UK, tells a conference at Chatham House in London that the United States is "destroying" the established world order.
- 7 March
  - Former Liverpool mayor Joe Anderson and city politician Derek Hatton are charged with bribery and misconduct relating to council contracts, along with 10 others.
  - All Eurostar train services from London to Paris are cancelled, following the discovery of an unexploded WW2 bomb in the French capital.
  - Three Bulgarian nationals – Vanya Gaberova, Katrin Ivanova, and Tihomir Ivanchev – are found guilty of spying for Russia, in what police describe as "one of the largest" foreign intelligence operations ever conducted in the UK.
  - Reform UK suspends MP Rupert Lowe and refers him to police, alleging he made "threats of physical violence" against party chairman Zia Yusuf.
  - The UK Health Security Agency is checking for potential cases of Lassa fever after an individual who visited the UK from Nigeria was identified as having the disease.
  - The Court of Appeal reduces the sentences of six environmental activists who organised a blockade of the M25.
- 8 March
  - Former national security adviser Mark Sedwill tells the BBC's The Week in Westminster the potential deployment of UK troops to Ukraine could last "many years".
  - Emergency services are called to Parliament after a man climbs the Elizabeth Tower holding a Palestinian flag, and refuses to come down.
  - Technical issues once again prevent Barclays customers from being able to make online transactions using the banks' app.
- 9 March
  - A man who scaled the Elizabeth Tower with a Palestinian flag the previous day is arrested after agreeing to be brought down in a cherry picker.
  - Hundreds of community events are held around the UK to mark five years since the outbreak of COVID-19 in the UK, which killed over 230,000 people.

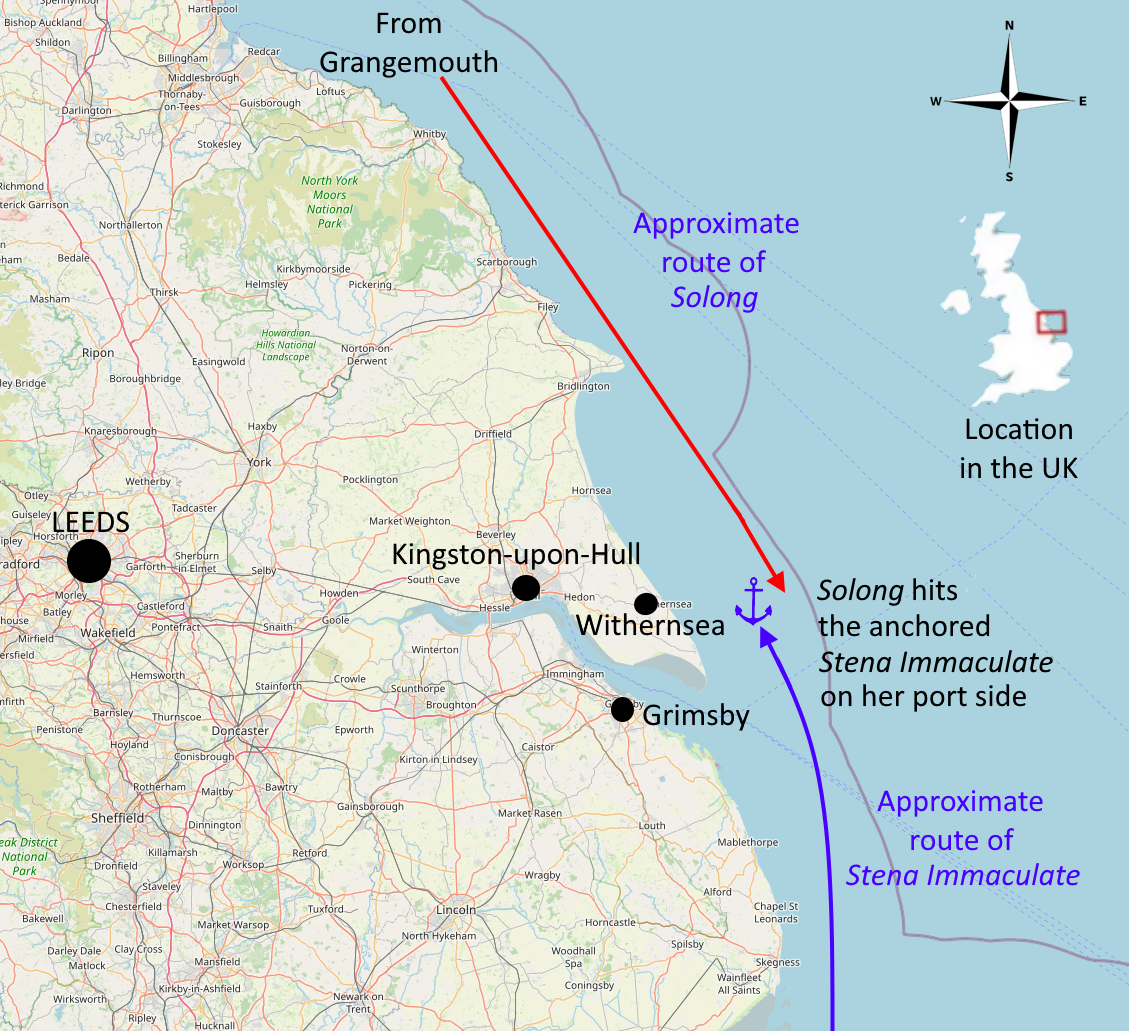
10 March 2025: A collision between two large ships occurs off the coast of East Yorkshire.

- 10 March
  - An oil tanker and container ship collide in the North Sea off the coast of Yorkshire, triggering a fireball and clouds of thick smoke. The crew members are brought ashore, with one hospitalised, but another person remains unaccounted for.
  - Energy Secretary Ed Miliband tells the BBC that discounts for energy customers living near electricity pylons will be paid for by an average 80p rise on bills for everyone else.
- 11 March
  - Manchester United announces a plan to build the UK's largest ever football stadium, close to and replacing the Old Trafford ground, costing £2bn and with capacity for 100,000 seats.
  - 2025 North Sea ship collision:
    - Investigations continue into the previous day's ship collision. This includes a criminal case launched by Humberside Police, who arrest a 59-year-old man on suspicion of gross negligence manslaughter.
    - One crew member of the MV Solong, one of the ships involved, remains unaccounted for and is now presumed dead.
    - Experts warn of the potentially devastating impact on the local environment, caused by leaking jet fuel with a much higher toxicity than crude oil.
  - Kyle Clifford is given a whole-life order after he used a crossbow to murder his ex-girlfriend, her sister and mother.
  - The Lancet reports that Lenacapavir, an annual injection to safeguard against HIV, has passed an early safety trial.
- 12 March
  - The UK is hit by 25% tariffs on aluminium and steel products imposed globally by the Trump administration.
  - Researchers have called for official health advice to recommend children completely avoid "slushy" ice drinks containing glycerol until they are at least eight years old, because it can make them very ill.
  - 2025 North Sea ship collision: The fire aboard the US tanker Stena Immaculate has been extinguished, authorities confirm.
  - The Met Office issues a yellow weather warning for ice affecting northern England as the UK experiences below average temperatures; snow also falls in parts of Shropshire and the Cotswolds, and briefly at the 2025 Cheltenham Festival.
- 13 March
  - Keir Starmer announces that NHS England is to be abolished in order to "cut bureaucracy", with its functions to be merged into the Department of Health and Social Care over the next two years.
  - The National Institute of Health and Care Excellence approves relugolix, used to treat the symptoms of endometriosis, for use by the NHS in England and Wales.
  - A British man, named as 79-year-old Edgar Charles Frederick, dies after being struck by a vehicle in the motorcade of Kenyan President William Ruto in Nairobi.
  - Cheshire Police have widened a criminal investigation into the Countess of Chester Hospital, where Lucy Letby worked, to focus on individual staff.
- 14 March
  - Office for National Statistics data indicates the UK economy retracted by 0.1% in January 2025, largely due to a decline in manufacturing.
  - The Investigatory Powers Tribunal begins hearing Apple's case against the UK government, which seeks to access private data held by Apple; the case is heard in private.
  - The Equality and Human Rights Commission has written to all 1,400 McDonald's outlets in the UK, warning their owners they could face legal action if they fail to take steps to protect staff against sexual abuse.
  - The Royal Mint releases a coin featuring a portrait of John Lennon to coincide with the year he would have turned 85.
  - 2025 North Sea ship collision: The captain of the MV Solong is charged with gross negligent manslaughter over the death of a crew member missing since the collision and presumed to be dead.
- 15 March
  - Starmer joins 29 other world leaders for a virtual summit to discuss a potential ceasefire in Ukraine.
  - The captain of the MV Solong is remanded in custody by Hull magistrates to appear before London's Central Criminal Court on 14 April.
- 17 March
  - The family of The Vivienne say the drag star died from a cardiac arrest caused by the effects of taking ketamine.
  - Tesco announces a 5.2% pay increase for its store employees from 30 March, but scrap the extra pay for working on Sundays.
  - The Financial Conduct Authority provisionally bans millionaire fund manager Crispin Odey from working in financial services and fines him £1.8m for a "lack of integrity" following allegations of sexual harassment, which he denies, and an attempt to "frustrate" a disciplinary process.
  - Mike Amesbury resigns as MP for Runcorn and Helsby.
- 18 March
  - Keir Starmer and Prince William pay tribute to John "Paddy" Hemingway, the last surviving Battle of Britain pilot, following his death at the age of 105. The RAF calls his passing "the end of an era and a poignant reminder of the sacrifices made by those who fought for freedom during World War II".
  - A woman in her 20s is killed, and three other people are injured, after a van ploughs into pedestrians on the Strand in central London. A 26-year-old man is arrested at the scene on suspicion of causing death by careless driving and drug driving. The Met Police say the incident is not terror-related.
  - Secretary of State for Work and Pensions Liz Kendall announces changes to the benefits system aimed at saving £5bn a year. The changes mostly consist of making it more difficult for people with less severe health conditions to claim disability payments.
  - A gang of four men are found guilty of stealing a gold toilet from Blenheim Palace in Oxfordshire in 2019.
- 19 March
  - Prosper family murders: Nicholas Prosper, 19, is sentenced to life in prison with a minimum term of 49 years for murdering his mother, brother, and sister in Luton the previous year.
  - UK COVID-19 Inquiry: Former Health Secretary Matt Hancock appears before the inquiry, and criticises the hearing's questioning on the Johnson government's decision to purchase personal protective equipment during the pandemic.
  - It is announced that the UK is to host the opening stage of the 2027 Tour de France for both the men's and women's races, with the men's race starting in Edinburgh.
  - Santander announces the closure of 95 of its UK branches – almost a quarter of its outlets – with the loss of 750 jobs.
  - The Royal Navy says it has shadowed four Russian vessels as they sailed through British waters in the English Channel and the North Sea.
- 20 March
  - The Bank of England holds interest rates at 4.5%.
  - The UK experiences its warmest day of the year so far, with temperatures reaching 21.3 °C (70.3 °F) in Northolt and Chertsey.
  - The Foreign, Commonwealth and Development Office issues a new travel warning for British citizens going to the United States, saying "The authorities in the US set and enforce entry rules strictly. You may be liable to arrest or detention if you break the rules."
  - A parole hearing for David Norris, convicted over the 1993 murder of Stephen Lawrence, is to be held in public, the Parole Board announces. The Board also suggest Norris accepts he was involved in the attack on Lawrence.
- 21 March
  - Hayes substation fire:
    - Heathrow Airport is closed for much of the day, disrupting an estimated 1,357 flights which are either cancelled or rerouted to other airports, following a large fire at a nearby electricity substation that supplies the airport with power.
    - During the afternoon, Heathrow announces some flights can safely resume, and that it hopes to run a full schedule the next day, but warns people not to travel to the airport unless they are advised to do so.
    - The Metropolitan Police launches an investigation into the cause of the fire, with counter-terror officers leading the inquiry.
  - Official figures show that government borrowing was at £10.7bn in February, higher than the £6.5bn forecast by the Office for Budget Responsibility.
  - Former nursing assistant Mohammad Farooq, who planned to bomb Leeds's St James's Hospital, and also planned to target an RAF base, is sentenced to life imprisonment with a minimum term of 37 years, after being convicted of preparing acts of terrorism.
- 22 March
  - Heathrow power outage: Energy Secretary Ed Miliband orders the National Energy System Operator to "urgently investigate" the power outage.
  - Facebook agrees to stop targeting adverts at Tanya Carroll, a woman from London who works in the tech policy and human rights sector, after she filed a lawsuit against them.
  - The last day of trading for the Homebase home improvement retailer, following their appointment into administration in November 2024.
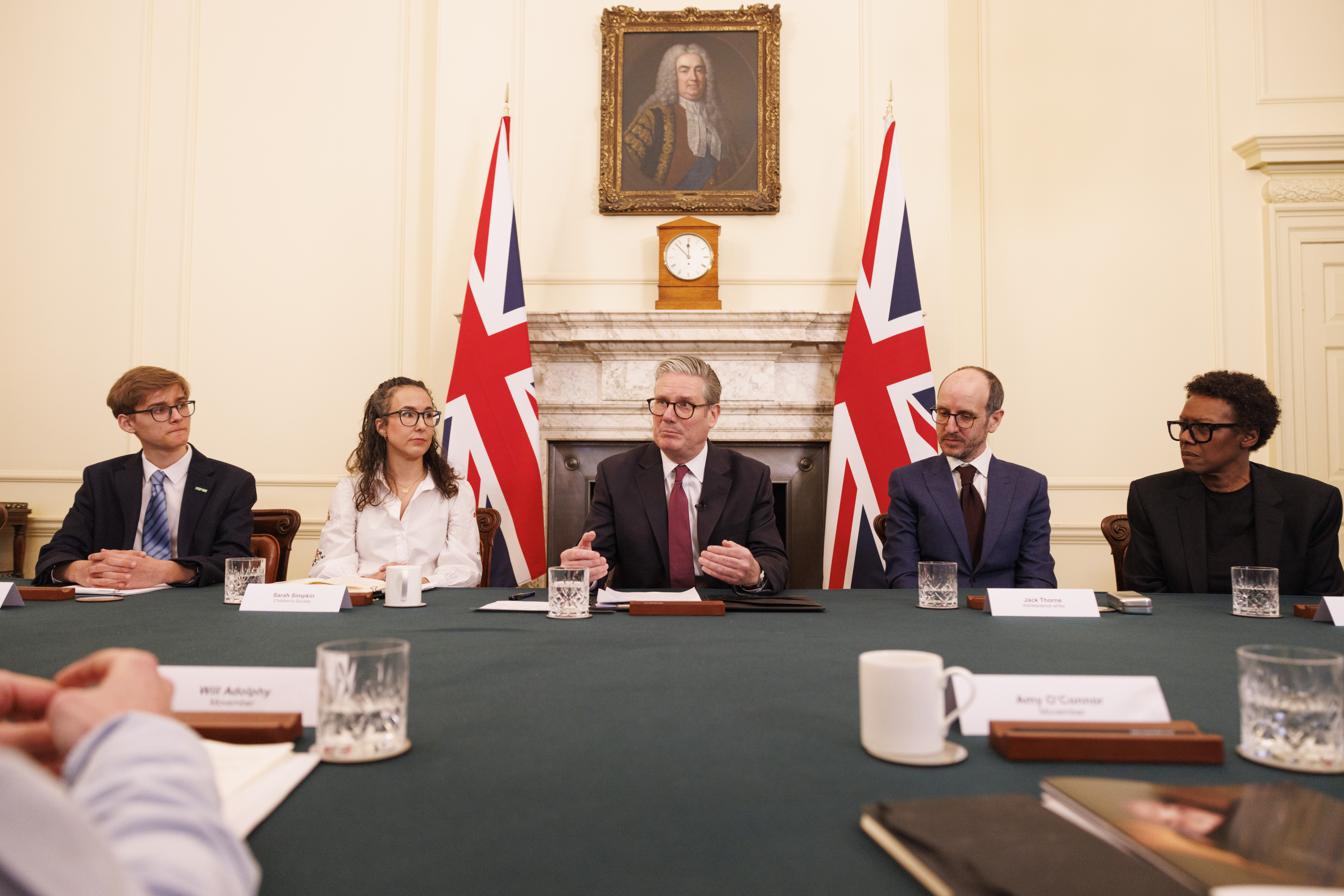
- The Prime Minister, Keir Starmer, holds a meeting with the creators of Adolescence
  24 March – Netflix drama Adolescence becomes the first streaming show to top the UK's weekly TV ratings, with 6.45 million people watching its first episode.
- 25 March
  - The £9bn Lower Thames Crossing is granted planning approval. With an underground length of 2.6 miles (4.2 km), it will become the UK's largest road tunnel when completed in 2032, surpassing the Queensway Tunnel in Merseyside.
  - Hayes substation fire: A police investigation into the fire concludes there is no evidence that it was started suspiciously.
- 26 March – Rachel Reeves delivers the March 2025 United Kingdom spring statement.
- 27 March
  - King Charles III spends a short time in hospital, and cancels a visit to Birmingham scheduled for the following day, after experiencing temporary side effects from his ongoing treatment for cancer.
  - Six female members of the activist group Youth Demand are arrested at the Westminster Meeting House on suspicion of conspiracy to cause a public nuisance. The arrests, the first to be carried out at a Quaker meeting house in the UK, are subsequently condemned by Quakers in Britain as "an aggressive violation".
- 28 March
  - Modella Capital agrees to buy W H Smith's High Street stores and plans to rename the outlets as TG Jones.
  - Former criminology student Nasen Saadi, described as having a "grievance against women", is sentenced to life imprisonment with a minimum term of 39 years for the May 2024 murder of Amie Gray and attempted murder of Leanne Miles in Bournemouth.
  - The Ministry of Defence launches an investigation after documents containing sensitive military information were found in a city street in Newcastle upon Tyne.
  - Michael Stewart steps down as head of the Prevent scheme following the 2024 Southport attack.
  - Van production at Vauxhall's Luton plant comes to an end after 120 years.
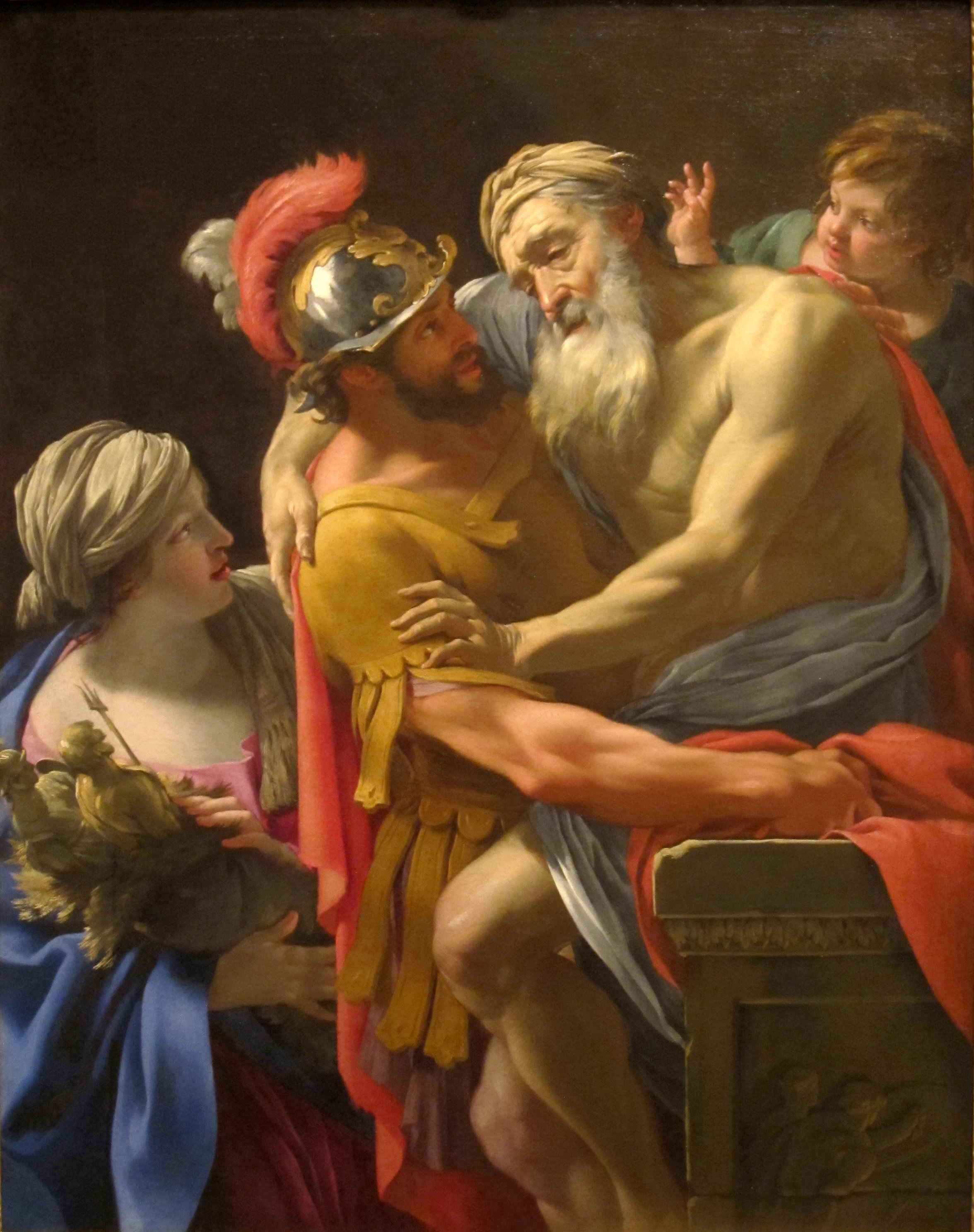
- Aeneas and his Father Fleeing Troy (c. 1635) by Simon Vouet, painting returned by Tate Britain to the descendants of owner it was stolen from
  29 March
  - A partial solar eclipse is visible from the UK.
  - Tate Britain confirms it is to return the painting Aeneas and His Family Fleeing Burning Troy, painted by Henry Gibbs in 1664, to a Jewish family from which it was stolen by the Nazis during World War II.
- 30 March – In his first interview since resigning as Archbishop of Canterbury, Justin Welby tells the BBC that he forgives barrister and prolific sexual abuser John Smyth.
- 31 March
  - Paul Marchant resigns as chief executive of Primark following an allegation by a woman about "his behaviour towards her in a social environment".
  - The inaugural Organised Immigration Crime Summit is held in London, and attended by representatives from around 40 countries, as well as social media organisations such as X, TikTok and Meta.
  - A Downing Street spokesman says that the UK expects to be affected by US tariffs and is not ruling out retaliating.
  - Buckingham Palace confirms the King will return to public duties in the coming days, including an audience with the prime minister and investitures at Windsor Castle.
  - Birmingham City Council declares a major incident over an ongoing strike by refuse collectors which has left 17,000 tons of uncollected rubbish on the city's streets.

=== April ===
- 1 April
  - A man is shot dead by police at Milton Keynes Central railway station following reports he was carrying a firearm.
  - Increases in a series of essential household bills – including gas and electric, water and council tax – prompt a warning from Citizen's Advice about the impact on households, including single parents.
  - The cost of an annual TV licence increases by £5 to £174.50.
  - A pilot scheme in Greater Manchester that allowed crime victims to attend criminals' parole hearings is to be extended to the rest of England and Wales.
- 2 April – Data from the British Social Attitudes Survey indicates satisfaction with the NHS fell sharply since the Covid-19 pandemic, from 60% in 2019 to 21% in 2024, with waiting times and staff shortages cited as concerns. The results from Wales showed that the public there were the most dissatisfied.
- 3 April
  - The FTSE 100 falls sharply in response to major, worldwide tariffs announced by US President Donald Trump, including a 10% charge on UK imports. The UK government announces it is planning a list of US products it could hit with retaliatory tariffs.
  - The expansion of Luton Airport is approved. An increase in annual passenger numbers from 16.9 to 32 million by 2043 is expected.
- 4 April
  - The FTSE 100 plunges for a second consecutive day, closing 4.9% lower, its biggest one-day drop since 27 March 2020.
  - Comedian Russell Brand is charged with rape, indecent assault and sexual assault relating to four separate women between 1999 and 2005.
  - The UK experiences its warmest day of the year so far, with temperatures reaching 23 °C in Otterbourne and Gosport in Hampshire.
  - A woman who killed her new-born baby in 1998, suffocated possibly when wads of tissue paper were inserted into his mouth and throat, is given a two-year suspended sentence.
- 5 April
  - Jaguar Land Rover halts shipments to the United States in response to the tariffs.
  - Nick Rockett, ridden by Patrick Mullins, wins the 2025 Grand National.
  - Labour MP Dan Norris is arrested on suspicion of rape, child sex offences, child abduction and misconduct in a public office. He is immediately suspended from the party.
- 6 April
  - Starmer, writing in the Sunday Telegraph, says "the world as we knew it has gone" following the US tariffs, and the UK government "stand[s] ready to use industrial policy to help shelter British business from the storm."
  - Supercentanarian, Ethel Caterham (born 21 August 1909) surpasses the final age of 115 years, 228 days achieved by Charlotte Hughes, becoming the oldest British person in history.
- 7 April
  - The price of a first class stamp increases by 5p to £1.70.
  - Grace Davidson becomes the first woman in the UK to give birth using a transplanted womb after giving birth to a daughter.
  - King Charles III and Queen Camilla release a set of photographs ahead of their 20th wedding anniversary showing them on a state visit to Italy.
  - The UK government announces a relaxation of electric vehicle sales targets to help the car industry following the US's introduction of trade tariffs.
  - As part of cost-cutting measures, the UK government is to review every organisation paid for by public funds.
- 9 April
  - Keir Starmer confirms that the first Universal theme park in Europe will be built in Bedfordshire.
  - Starmer announces that an extra 3,000 police officers – made up of neighbourhood officers and community support officers – will be recruited by police forces over the next 12 months.
  - Seven officers are injured in a multi-vehicle collision during a police chase on the A1 near Newcastle.
  - Ofcom launches its first investigation into a pro-suicide forum after getting powers to do so under the Online Safety Act.
- 11 April
  - Office for National Statistics figures indicate the UK economy grew by 0.5% in February 2025, largely fuelled by the service sector and £500m of exports to the United States as businesses rushed to beat US trade tariffs.
  - A rapid rise in "quishing" scams involving QR codes is reported, with a 14-fold increase in cases between 2019 and 2024.
  - Rishi Sunak's Resignation Honours are published. They include peerages for Michael Gove, Alister Jack and Simon Hart, and knighthoods for Jeremy Hunt and James Cleverly.
  - It is reported that the UK government's Access to Work scheme, which allows companies to apply for grants to support disabled employees, owes businesses several hundred thousand pounds.
  - Manchester's Viadux 2 is granted planning permission. It will become the tallest UK building outside London, at a height of 246 m (807 ft) and with 76 floors.
- 12 April
  - Parliament is recalled to discuss emergency legislation to save the Scunthorpe Steelworks from closure. Emergency legislation is passed allowing the UK government to take control of the steelworks, and prevent owners Jingye from closing it.
  - Three prison officers at HM Prison Frankland are treated in hospital for burns and stab wounds following an attack by Hashem Abedi, one of the men responsible for the Manchester Arena bombing.
  - The UK records its highest temperature of the year so far, with 24 °C (75.2 °F) recorded in Northolt, north west London.
- 13 April – Cambridge win both the 170th Men's and the 79th Women's Boat Race.
- 14 April
  - Birmingham bin strike:
    - Military planners are called in to help tackle mounting piles of rubbish in Birmingham following a month-long strike by refuse workers.
    - Refuse workers "overwhelmingly" reject the latest pay offer from Birmingham City Council.
  - The UK government suspends kitchen use for high security prisoners housed in separation units following Hashem Abedi's attack on three prison guards at Frankland Prison.
- 15 April – The UK's longest-running women's magazine, The Lady, announces it has ceased publication after 140 years, with the April 2025 edition being its last in print. The magazine's website will continue though.
- 16 April
  - The Supreme Court rules that the legal definition of a woman is based on biological sex and that only biological and not trans women meet the definition of a woman under equality laws. The Court adds that transgender people will remain protected from discrimination or harassment under the Equality Act.
  - Far-right activist Tommy Robinson loses a Court of Appeal challenge against his prison sentence.
  - Inflation falls for the second consecutive month, from 2.8% in February to 2.6% in March.
  - The separation centre at HMP Frankland is emptied of prisoners, with Hashem Abedi being transferred to the high-security HMP Belmarsh.
- 17 April
  - Justice Secretary Shabana Mahmood announces that the Prison Service will conduct a review of whether protective body armour should be made available to frontline staff.
  - Following the previous day's ruling that trans women do not meet the definition of women under Equality Laws, the British Transport Police announces that trans women arrested on Britain’s railways will in future be strip-searched by male officers “in accordance with the biological birth sex of the detainee”.
  - The chairwoman of the Equality and Human Rights Commission warns that the NHS will be pursued if it does not follow new guidance on single-sex spaces.
  - The annual GDP of the City of London passes the £100 billion mark for the first time.
- 18 April
  - Italian police confirm that a British couple were among four people killed in a cable car crash near Naples the previous day.
  - Sweet manufacturer Mondelēz International announces it is discontinuing the dark chocolate version of its Toblerone bar in the UK.
  - A no fly zone is put in place over the Sandringham Estate after drones were spotted flying over the estate during the 2 March visit of Ukrainian President Volodymyr Zelenskyy.
  - The UK government announces that pubs in England and Wales will be able to stay open until 1am on 8 May to celebrate the 80th anniversary of VE Day.
- 19 April – Transgender rights protesters gather outside Parliament following a Supreme Court ruling on the definition of a woman. Police subsequently launch an investigation after several statues, including those of women's votes campaigner Dame Millicent Fawcett and former South African prime minister Jan Smuts, are damaged during the protest.
- 19 April – 5 May – The 2025 World Snooker Championship takes place in Sheffield.
- 20 April – DHL Express suspends deliveries to the US worth more than $800 (£603) because of new tariffs, which it says have resulted in a "significant increase" in red tape at customs.
- 21 April – Leaders from across the UK including the Prime Minister and King Charles pay tribute to Pope Francis, following his death at the age of 88.
- 22 April
  - Kensington Palace confirms that Prince William will attend Pope Francis's funeral on 26 April. Prime Minister Keir Starmer will also attend.
  - Justice Secretary Shabana Mahmood announces a judge-led inquiry into the 2023 Nottingham attacks; the inquiry will be chaired by Deborah Taylor.
  - Marks & Spencer says it has been dealing with a cyberattack which has led to delays in some online deliveries.
  - A consultancy on redundancies at British Steel's Scunthorpe plant will not go ahead after the UK government took control of the facility.
  - The UK government announces a nationalities league table for crimes.
  - The Dean of the Faculty of Advocates criticises Scottish Green MSP Maggie Chapman for her comments about "bigotry, prejudice and hatred coming from the Supreme Court", following its judgement on the definition of a woman.
  - The International Monetary Fund forecasts a further three interest rate cuts for the UK during 2025.
- 24 April – Office for National Statistics data indicates a 22% increase in personal thefts in England and Wales during 2024 when compared to the previous year.
- 25 April – Marks & Spencer temporarily stops taking online orders as it continues to recover from a cyberattack earlier in the week.
- 26 April
  - Prince William and Keir Starmer are among world dignitaries to attend the funeral of Pope Francis at St Peter's Basilica in Rome.
  - The Equalities and Human Rights Commission publishes interim guidance on how organisations should interpret the UK Supreme Court ruling on the definition of a woman, recommending that transgender people should be offered alternative facilities to use.
  - The Royal Navy says that ships have been deployed from Portsmouth and Plymouth in recent days to track Russian warships that entered British waters.
  - Just Stop Oil protestors march through London for what is described as their "final day of action". During the march a minivan appears to be driven deliberately at demonstrators.
- 27 April – Two members of the protest group Youth Demand are arrested after throwing powder paint over Tower Bridge during the 2025 London Marathon.
- 28 April
  - The UK government announces that asylum seekers convicted of sexual offences will not be allowed to stay in the UK.
  - A 14-year-old girl who stabbed two teachers and a pupil at a Welsh school while screaming "I'm going to kill you" has been sentenced to 15 years in detention.
- 29 April
  - Dr. Victoria McCloud, the UK's only openly transgender judge, announces plans to take the UK government to the European Court of Human Rights over the Supreme Court's ruling on biological sex.
  - A consultation process is launched to consider extending the sugar tax to more pre-packaged drinks, such as milkshakes and lattes.
  - The UK records its warmest temperature of the year so far, with 24.9 °C (76.8 °F) in Ross-on-Wye, Herefordshire, and Trawscoed, west Wales.
- 30 April
  - Royal Mail shareholders approve a £3.6bn sale of its parent company to EP Group.
  - The Co-op temporarily closes part of its IT system following a cyberattack.
  - Richard Burrows, a former housemaster at a Cheshire boarding school who spent three decades on the run in Thailand, is sentenced to 46 years in prison for sexual offences involving 24 boys between 1968 and 1995.

=== May ===
- 1 May
  - The record is broken for the UK's warmest start to May, with temperatures reaching 29 °C in London.
  - The Football Association announces that transgender women will no longer be able to play in women’s football in England from 1 June.
  - Ethel Caterham becomes the world's oldest person, at the age of 115 years and 252 days.
  - Harrods becomes the latest UK retailer to be hit by a cyberattack.
  - Local elections are held in England.
  - Two Palestinian girls from Gaza become the first to arrive in the UK for medical treatment since the war with Israel began in October 2023.
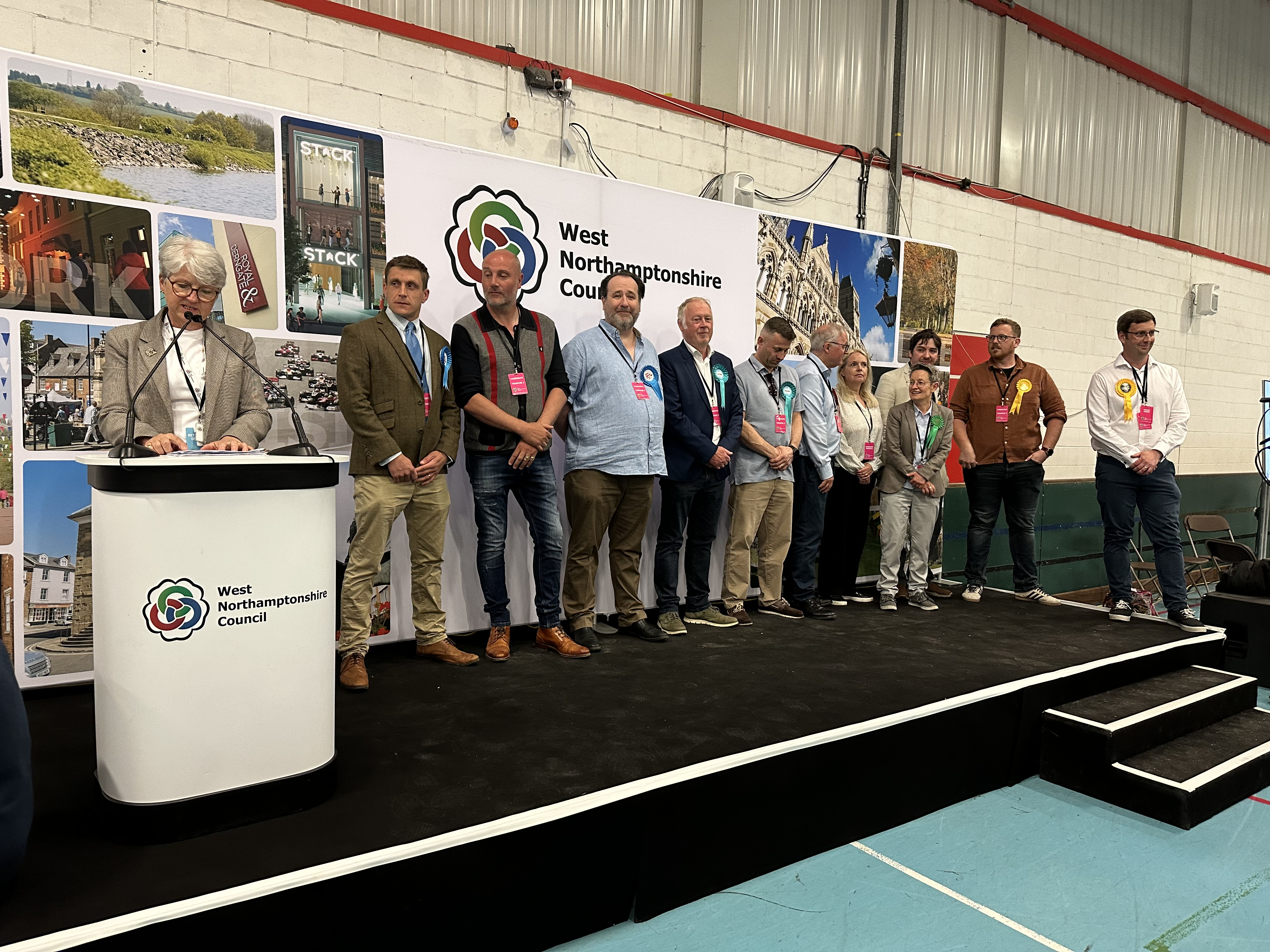
- Declaration of the results in the Towcester ward at the 2025 West Northamptonshire Council election
  2 May
  - Reform UK wins 677 of around 1,600 seats contested in the English local elections, making gains mostly at the expense of the Conservatives. Reform also wins the Runcorn and Helsby by-election and the Lincolnshire mayoral election.
  - The Liberal Democrats gain an extra 160 seats, and control of Oxfordshire County Council, Shropshire County Council and Cambridgeshire County Council.
  - United Nations judge Lydia Mugambe is sentenced to six years and four months in prison for keeping a Ugandan woman as a domestic slave while Mugambe was studying for a PhD in Law at the University of Oxford.
  - Prince Harry loses an appeal over the level of security he and his family are entitled to while in the UK, and tells the BBC he wishes to reconcile with the Royal family, but that King Charles III will not talk to him.
- 3 May – Eight men, including seven Iranian nationals, are arrested in two separate counter-terrorism police investigations, one of them concerning an investigation to "target a specific premises".
- 4 May – Uber begins allowing customers across most of the UK to pay taxi fares in cash.
- 5 May
  - A BBC investigation says that Bulgarian nationals Orlin Roussev, Biser Dzhambazov and Katrin Ivanova, who were convicted of spying for Russia, attended an event to debate Brexit in a committee room at the Palace of Westminster in May 2016.
  - Zhao Xintong of China wins the 2025 World Snooker Championship after defeating Mark Williams 18-12 in the final.
  - Two motorcycle riders, named as Owen Jenner of the United Kingdom and Shane Richardson of New Zealand, die following an 11-bike crash during a British Superbike event in Cheshire.
- 5 to 8 May – VE Day 80 – A Shared Moment of Celebration: five hundred lamp lights of peace are lit across the United Kingdom, the Crown Dependencies and the British Overseas Territories, as part of the 80th anniversary of Victory in Europe Day.
- 6 May
  - After three years of talks, the UK and India agree a trade deal that will reduce duty on UK goods such as whisky and cars exported to India and on Indian goods such as clothing and cars imported into the UK.
  - Two men are arrested after a man, subsequently named as Gurvinder Singh Johal, is stabbed to death at a Lloyds Bank in Derby.
- 7 May
  - Transport Secretary Heidi Alexander announces that the minimum age for being a train driver will be lowered from 20 to 18, in a bid to reduce staff shortages that often lead to service cancellations.
  - Phase 4 of the Hornsea Wind Farm off the coast of East Yorkshire is scrapped by Danish company Ørsted, due to recent cost increases.
- 8 May
  - The Bank of England cuts interest rates from 4.5% to 4.25%.
  - The UK and US agree a trade deal that will give UK businesses relief from some of the tariffs US President Donald Trump had introduced on products such as cars, steel and aluminium since he became president in January, and remove long-standing UK tariffs on US beef.
- 9 May
  - It is announced that transgender women will no longer be able to use the women's toilets in the Scottish Parliament building.
  - Daniel Graham, 39, and Adam Carruthers, 32, both from Cumbria, are found guilty of illegally cutting down the world famous Sycamore Gap tree. They will be sentenced on 15 July.
  - The Royal Horticultural Society unveils Catherine's Rose, a rose named after the Princess of Wales and intended to highlight the healing power of nature.
- 10 May – Starmer attends a summit in Kyiv with other European leaders, and describes the outcome of the meeting as a "significant moment" in the journey to securing a ceasefire with Russia.
- 12 May
  - Starmer unveils a proposal for major changes to the UK immigration system – including English tests for all visa applicants and their adult dependants, a cut in recruitment of overseas care workers, and a longer route to settled status.
  - A widespread power outage causes severe disruption on the London Underground.
  - At a hearing at the Old Bailey, six Bulgarians who were convicted of spying for the Kremlin are sentenced to a collective total of 50 years imprisonment.
  - Counter-terrorism police have launched an investigation after two properties linked to the prime minister were damaged in arson attacks.
- 13 May – The Court of Appeal quashes the conviction of Peter Sullivan, who spent 38 years in prison for the 1986 murder of Diane Sindall, following the emergence of new evidence.
- 14 May
  - A further 1,400 prison spaces are to be freed up in England and Wales after the UK government announces a further raft of early releases. Three new prisons will also be built at a cost of £4.7bn.
  - Evri and DHL's UK operation announce a merger that will create a parcel delivery company that will handle over a billion packages a year.
- 15 May
  - Office for National Statistics figures have shown the UK economy grew by 0.7% in the first three months of the year, higher than expected.
  - The Metropolitan Police confirm that a 21-year-old man has been charged over fires at two properties and a car linked to the prime minister.
  - During an official visit to Albania, Starmer says that the UK is in talks with other countries with a view to establishing "overseas return hubs" for failed asylum seekers.
- 16 May
  - MPs vote to amend the Terminally Ill Adults (End of Life) Bill to allow healthcare staff to opt out of helping in the process of assisted dying if they wish to.
  - Some Tesco customers have reported difficulty in accessing the retailer's app and website.
  - The UK's longest direct train service, a 775 mile route linking Aberdeen and Penzance, runs for the final time after 100 years of use after operator CrossCountry decided to end the service in favour of a more efficient timetable.
  - High Court of Justice judge Jeremy Johnson dismisses a claim by an Afghan man living in Kabul who had filed a lawsuit against Guardian News & Media after an article published by The Guardian used a photo of him to identify Afghan murder victim Hamed Sabouri.
- 17 May
  - A stabbing incident in Thamesmead, South East London, results in five people being hospitalised, all of whom are subsequently arrested.
  - A second arrest is made in connection with fires at properties linked to the prime minister.
- 19 May
  - The UK brokers a deal with the EU covering defence, food, fishing and passport checks.
  - A third arrest is made in connection with fires at properties linked to the prime minister.
- 20 May
  - Gaza crisis:
    - The UK, France, and Canada demand that Israel end its Gaza offensive, as reports emerge of 14,000 babies at risk of starvation within the next 48 hours, a false accusation made by UN officials, which was debunked and retracted within days.
    - The UK suspends trade talks with Israel and summons its ambassador, Tzipi Hotovely. Speaking in the House of Commons, Foreign Secretary David Lammy describes the situation in Gaza as "intolerable" and "abominable".
  - Logistics firm Peter Green Chilled, a distributor to major supermarkets including Tesco, Sainsbury's, and Aldi Süd, announces it has been the victim of a ransomware attack.
  - A second individual is charged and remanded over fires at properties linked to the prime minister.
- 21 May
  - The world's first gonorrhoea vaccine is launched by NHS England, with an efficacy of 30–40%.
  - West Nile virus is detected in UK mosquitoes for the first time.
  - Inflation rises from 2.6% to 3.5% for April, its highest level in over a year, and more than the 3.3% forecast. The rise is attributed to an increase in household bills in April.
  - In a U-turn, Starmer announces that the UK government will re-examine the threshold for winter fuel payments, and that he wants more pensioners to be eligible for the payment.
  - The Met Office forecasts rain for the Spring Bank Holiday weekend, bringing the prolonged spell of warm weather to an end.
  - A third man is charged in connection with fires at properties linked to the prime minister.
  - Marks & Spencer says the disruption caused by its cyberattack will last until July.
  - The UK government announces plans for a single parking app, which would replace the present situation of people needing to download several apps to pay for parking.
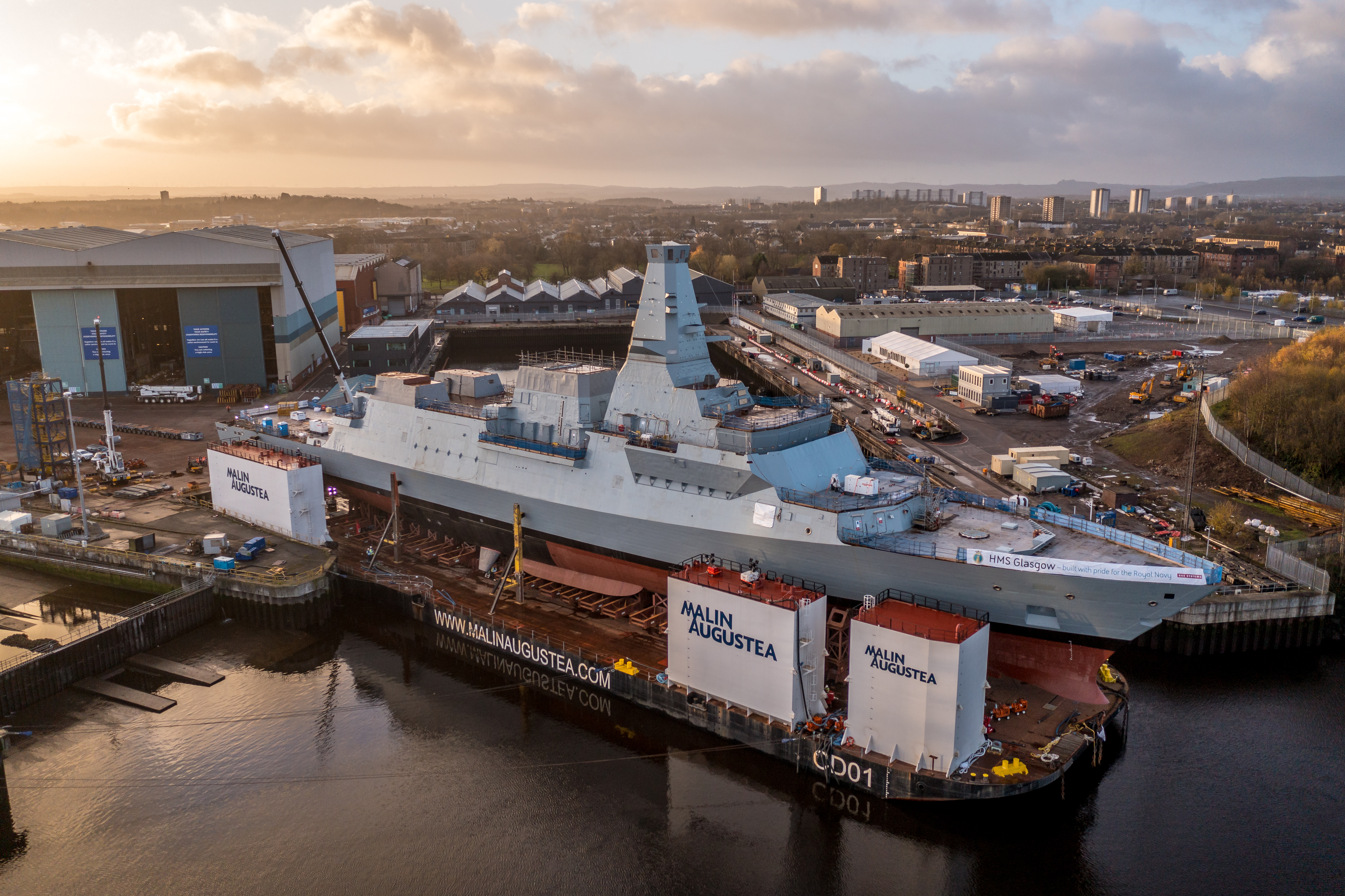
- HMS Glasgow (pictured in 2022)
  22 May
  - The UK signs a deal with Mauritius to hand over sovereignty of the Chagos Islands, and lease back the military base at Diego Garcia for an annual cost of £101m.
  - The Princess of Wales officially names the UK's newest warship, HMS Glasgow, at a ceremony on the River Clyde.
  - An independent sentencing review recommends the release of prisoners in England and Wales, including some serious offenders, after a third of their sentence if they have demonstrated good behaviour in order to ease prison overcrowding. The principles of the review are accepted by the Justice Secretary, who also announces that a voluntary chemical castration scheme for sex offenders will be extended to 20 prisons.
  - Office for National Statistics figures indicate that net migration to the UK fell by almost 50% between 2023 and 2024, mainly due to restrictions introduced by the previous Conservative government, with a net increase of 431,000.
  - Scientists at the National Oceanography Centre and Met Office have reported a 4 °C increase in sea temperature around the UK and Ireland due to the recent heatwave, potentially impacting on marine life.
  - The French Navy impounds a British fishing vessel which it accuses of fishing illegally.
- 23 May
  - Ofgem announces that the Energy price cap will fall by 7% in July, with the average household energy bill dropping by £129 per year to £1,720, but still higher than it was a year ago.
  - Police in Sri Lanka have arrested a British woman after allegedly finding 101 lbs of kush, a synthetic drug, in her suitcase.
  - American buyout firm RedBird Capital Partners agrees to buy The Daily Telegraph, The Sunday Telegraph, and The Spectator following a two year ownership vacuum.
  - IT firm Tata Consultancy Services, which provides IT services to Marks & Spencer, has launched an investigation to determine whether it was the source of the IT attack on the retailer.
- 24 May
  - A 41-year-old man is arrested on suspicion of murder, following the deaths of a woman and three children in a house fire in Brent, north-west London.
  - Ofcom launches an investigation into Royal Mail after delivery targets were missed for a quarter of first class mail.
- 25 May
  - Labour's renationalisation of the UK's railways begins as the train operator South Western Railway is taken into public ownership.
  - Gary Lineker presents his final Match of the Day after 26 years of hosting the BBC show.
- 26 May – 130 people are injured, with at least 50 treated in hospital after a car ploughs into a large crowd at a parade in Liverpool to celebrate Liverpool F.C.'s 2024–25 Premier League title win. A man is arrested, but the incident is not being treated as terrorist-related.
- 27 May – The International Monetary Fund has increased its growth forecast for the UK economy during 2025 to 1.2% after downgrading it from 1.6% to 1.1% last month, and to 1.4% during 2026, but warns the Chancellor to stick to her tax and spending plans.
- 28 May
  - Thames Water is fined £122.7m for breaching rules over sewage spills and shareholder payouts.
  - Tens of thousands of energy customers who had prepayment meters forcibly installed may be eligible for compensation of up to £1,000, as well as having their debts written off.
  - The Crown Prosecution Service outlines 21 charges it intends to bring against social media influencers Andrew and Tristan Tate upon their return to the UK.
- 29 May
  - A rule that prevented heat pumps from being fitted within a metre of a neighbouring property is rescinded, in a bid to improve the rate of new installations.
  - Two new reservoirs – the UK's first since 1992 – are granted planning approval. The Fens Reservoir and Lincolnshire Reservoir are scheduled for completion in 2036 and 2040, respectively.
  - Liverpool parade incident: A suspect is charged with offences relating to grievous bodily harm and dangerous driving. He appears in court the following day, where he is remanded in custody and a provisional trial date is set for 24 November.
  - Figures published by the Society for Motor Manufacturers and Traders indicate 59,203 vehicles were made in the UK during April, the lowest figure in 70 years (excluding April 2020), and coinciding with the introduction of US tariffs and the Easter holidays, both of which impacted on manufacturing.
  - Lawyers representing Andrew and Tristan Tate say they will return to the UK to face criminal charges once proceedings against them have concluded in Romania.
- 30 May
  - Russell Brand, appearing at Southwark Crown Court, pleads not guilty to charges of rape, sexual assault and indecent assault.
  - Gerry Adams, leader of Sinn Féin from 1983 until 2018, is awarded €100,000 in a libel case in Dublin against the BBC.
  - A prison officer has undergone emergency surgery after being stabbed during an attack at HM Prison Long Lartin in Worcestershire.
- 31 May
  - Secretary of State for Defence John Healey announces that the UK government is to spend £1.5bn on at least six new munitions and explosives factories to "better deter our adversaries".
  - Rugby league authorities say their players have been "poorly treated" by the honours system, as pressure grows for a first knighthood or damehood for the sport.
  - More than 1,100 migrants cross the English Channel in a single day, the highest number of 2025 so far.

=== June ===
- 1 June
  - The sale of disposable vapes is banned in the UK.
  - The Institute for Fiscal Studies says that tough choices are "unavoidable" as the UK government finalises its Spending Review, due to be announced on 11 June.
  - The Met Office projects that the UK is twice as likely to experience a hotter than average summer during 2025.
  - An intruder is arrested in the grounds of Windsor Castle after entering a restricted area.
- 2 June
  - Keir Starmer, speaking in Glasgow, outlines the strategic defence review and says the UK is moving to "war-fighting readiness". He announces the building of up to 12 new attack submarines, and confirms that £15bn will be spent on upgrading nuclear warheads.
  - The Met Office reports that March–May 2025 was the UK's warmest spring on record, and the driest in more than 50 years. The agency predicts that the UK will experience a hotter-than-normal summer with an increased chance of heatwaves.
  - 2025 Liverpool parade incident: Merseyside police confirm that 109 people were injured during the incident.
  - The UK government announces plans to fast track the remodelling of flight paths in a plan that it believes will shorten journey times and lead to fewer delays.
  - A fourth person is arrested in connection with fires at properties linked to the prime minister.
- 3 June
  - The Organisation for Economic Co-operation and Development (OECD) warns that UK economic growth will be impacted because of US tariff barriers and high interest payments on government debt.
  - Private equity firm KKR pulls out of a planned £4bn rescue package for Thames Water, placing the utility company's future in jeopardy.
  - Portuguese and German police begin a fresh search for missing British toddler Madeleine McCann, who disappeared in Portugal in May 2007.
  - Fashion brand The North Face and jewellers Cartier become the latest victims of cyberattacks.
- 4 June
  - The Trump administration's executive order doubling steel and aluminium tariffs from 25% to 50% is temporarily suspended for the UK.
  - In a government U-turn, the chancellor, Rachel Reeves, confirms that more pensioners will receive winter fuel payments in the coming winter.
  - Reeves announces £15bn investment for tram, bus and train projects in the Midlands, northern England and West Country.
  - Police launch an investigation into a number of deaths of patients following heart operations at Castle Hill Hospital in Hull.
- 5 June
  - The renewed search for Madeleine McCann in Portugal ends after three days, with investigators having searched places in the area where she disappeared.
  - Professional footballer Jay Emmanuel-Thomas, who imported £600,000 of cannabis into the UK from Thailand in September 2024, is sentenced to four years in prison.
- 6 June
  - The Met Office issues a yellow weather warning for thunderstorms and torrential rain covering large areas of England and Wales for Saturday 7 June.
  - Oghenochuko Ojiri, a former art expert on the television series Bargain Hunt, is sentenced to two years and six months in prison for failing to declare art he sold to a suspected Hezbollah financier.
  - BBC News reports that the M&S hackers sent an email to the retailer's chief executive, Stuart Machin, boasting about what they had done and demanding money.
- 7 June – A Delta Air Lines flight from London to Detroit is forced to return to Heathrow Airport because of a cracked windscreen.
- 8 June – Addressing the Blue Economy and Finance Forum in Monaco, Prince William describes the challenge of protecting the world's oceans as "like none that we have ever faced before" and says that with life on the ocean floor "diminishing before our eyes" there is a need for action "on a global, national and local level".
- 9 June
  - 2025 Ballymena riots: Riots break out in Ballymena after two Romanian teenagers were charged for the attempted rape of a teenage girl. Two police cars and multiple properties are damaged, with 15 police officers being injured and one rioter arrested.
  - In a change to the policy implemented for the previous winter, the chancellor, Rachel Reeves confirms that three quarters of old age pensioners – roughly nine million – will receive winter fuel payments during the coming winter, with pensioners on an annual income of £35,000 or less eligible to receive the benefit.
  - Former plastic surgeon Jonathan Peter Brooks is sentenced to life imprisonment with a minimum term of 22 years for the attempted murder of a colleague who he wanted "out of the way" because he was a witness in a disciplinary proceeding.
  - NHS Blood and Transplant warns of a shortage of blood supplies, and calls for a further 200,000 donors to come forward.
  - It is announced that the 2026 Brit Awards will be held at Manchester's Co-op Live arena, the first time the ceremony has been held outside London.
- 10 June
  - 2025 Ballymena riots: A second night of disorder in Ballymena leaves 17 police officers injured as five people are arrested. Protests also break out in Belfast, Carrickfergus, Coleraine, Lisburn and Newtownabbey.
  - The UK sanctions Israeli ministers Itamar Ben-Gvir and Bezalel Smotrich over what it describes as "repeated incitements of violence against Palestinian communities" in the occupied West Bank.
  - The UK government announces it will commit £14.2 billion to building the Sizewell C nuclear power plant.
  - Retired rugby league player Billy Boston becomes the first person from the sport to receive a knighthood.
  - Marks & Spencer announces it is restarting online sales, with customers in England, Scotland and Wales able to order a selection of fashion and footwear.
  - Deputy Prime Minister Angela Rayner announces that the Vagrancy Act 1824, which makes rough sleeping a crime, is to be scrapped by spring 2026.
- 11 June
  - Chancellor Rachel Reeves delivers her Spending Review to the House of Commons.
  - Reeves announces that the UK government intends to end the use of hotels to accommodate asylum seekers by 2029.
  - The first yellow heat-health alerts of the year are issued by the UK Health Security Agency (UKHSA), covering much of eastern England from 21:00 BST on Thursday 12 June until 08:00 on Sunday 15 June, with temperatures of up to 30 °C (86 °F) expected. The Met Office also warns of thunderstorms and potential flash flooding.
  - The UK agrees a deal with the European Union over Gibraltar's status after Brexit, which avoids the need for checks on people and goods crossing the Gibraltar–Spain border.
  - A third night of violence breaks out in Northern Ireland, with a leisure centre damaged in Larne, County Antrim.
- 12 June
  - Fifty-three British nationals are confirmed to have been on board Air India Flight 171, a London-bound Boeing 787 that crashed after take-off from Ahmedabad, India. One survivor, a British man, is reported.
  - The UK economy shrinks by 0.3% in April, as jobs are cut and investment plans cancelled due to higher taxes and US trade tariffs.
  - The Safekeep by Yael van der Wouden is named winner of the 2025 Women's Prize for Fiction, while The Story of a Heart by Rachel Clarke is the winner of the Women's Prize for Non-Fiction.
- 13 June
  - Among those to be recognised in the 2025 Birthday Honours are actor Gary Oldman and footballer David Beckham who receive Knighthoods, singer and actor Elaine Paige who receives a damehood, and television presenters Claudia Winkleman and Tess Daly who receive MBEs.
  - James Sheen and Michael Jones are sentenced to prison terms of four years and two years and three months respectively for stealing a gold toilet from an art exhibition at Blenheim Palace in September 2019.
  - The UK experiences its warmest day of the year so far, with a temperature of 29.4 °C recorded at Downham, west Suffolk.
  - Two skydivers are killed in an accident at Dunkeswell Aerodrome in Devon.
- 14 June
  - King Charles III attends the 2025 Trooping the Colour to mark his official birthday.
  - In a U-turn, the prime minister announces plans for a full national statutory inquiry into grooming gangs.
  - June 2025 Israeli strikes on Iran: The prime minister announces that more RAF planes will be sent to the Middle East as fighting between Israel and Iran intensifies.
  - The Met Office says that 30,000 lightning strikes were recorded across England overnight as thunderstorms hit many parts of the country.
- 15 June
  - The Foreign, Commonwealth and Development Office warns against travel to Israel following its military activity with Iran.
  - The UK government writes to Sainsbury's and Morrisons to ask them to cease "advertising and promoting" heated tobacco products, which it says it believes is against the law. The supermarkets disagree with the government's interpretation of the law.
  - The company building HS2 is said to have reported one of its subcontractors to the HM Revenue and Customs over alleged tax fraud.
- 16 June
  - Publication of a report on grooming gangs prepared by Baroness Louise Casey, which says the ethnicity of people involved in the gangs has been "shied away from".
  - The Princess of Wales attends the Order of the Garter service at Windsor Castle after missing the event in 2024 due to her cancer diagnosis and treatment.
  - The UK government announces £590m of funding towards the Lower Thames Crossing, the UK's longest road tunnel, which is expected to cost £10bn to construct and be finished by 2032.
  - Blaise Metreweli is appointed as the 18th Chief of MI6 and will succeed Sir Richard Moore later in the year.
- 17 June
  - MPs vote to decriminalise women who terminate their own pregnancy in ways contrary to the current abortion laws.
  - The UK and US sign a trade deal that will see a 10% levy on most UK goods, including cars, but does not include steel imports.
- 18 June
  - The UK government confirms the opening of HS2 will be delayed beyond the target date of 2033, but has not given a revised date for when it will begin operating.
  - A 59-year-old woman, named as Yvonne Ford from Barnsley, South Yorkshire, is reported to have died from rabies following a scratch from a stray dog while on holiday in Morocco in February. The UK Health Security Agency says there is no risk to the wider public from the case.
  - UK inflation fell to 3.4% in May from 3.5% in April, with a drop in fuel prices contributing to the decline and offsetting a rise in food prices.
  - The Confederation of British Industry (CBI) downgrades its economic growth forecast for the UK during 2025 and 2026 because of tariffs imposed by the Trump administration.
  - The Princess of Wales pulls out of a planned appearance at Royal Ascot.
  - Jeremy Hunt, a former Secretary of State for Health, calls for an "urgent re-examination" of the Lucy Letby case after experts raised "serious and credible" questions over the conviction.
  - The Rev. Clive Foster is appointed as the UK's first Windrush Commissioner and will hold the post for three years.
  - The UK government changes the rules for which households can qualify for the £150 Warm Home Discount for the forthcoming winter, meaning double the number of homes will qualify in 2025–26.
- 19 June
  - The Bank of England holds interest rates at 4.25%. Governor Andrew Bailey says "interest rates remain on a gradual downward path" but cautions "the world is highly unpredictable".
  - Chinese PhD student Zhenhao Zou is sentenced at Inner London Crown Court to life in prison, with a minimum term of 24 years, after being convicted of 11 counts of rape against 10 women. It is reported that video evidence showed there may be as many as 50 further victims, and police say he could be "one of the most prolific sexual predators that we've ever seen in this country."
  - A heatwave is officially declared in Suffolk, with many other regions expected to follow soon, as health alerts remain in place. A temperature of 32.2 °C is recorded in Kew, London.
  - The National Institute for Health and Care Excellence (NICE) decides not to make two Alzheimer's drugs, donanemab and lecanemab, available for use by the NHS after deeming them to be too expensive with far too few benefits.
  - Wales becomes the first part of the UK to ban wet wipes containing plastic after the Senedd votes to make their sale illegal from December 2026.
- 20 June
  - The Terminally Ill Adults (End of Life) Bill passes in the House of Commons with 314 in favour and 291 against, a majority of 23. It will now proceed to the House of Lords.
  - Seven people are arrested following an altercation between rival protest groups outside the Iranian embassy in London during which two people were assaulted.
  - The Met Office issues a yellow alert for torrential rain and thunderstorms for Saturday 21 June as the heatwave continues.
  - Clothing retailer River Island announces plans to close 33 of its UK stores, citing the increase in online sales and rising operational costs as the reason.
  - Office for National Statistics data indicates that supermarket sales fell by 2.7% in May 2025, their largest fall since December 2023.
- 21 June
  - The UK experiences its warmest day of the year, with a temperature of 33.2 °C recorded at Charlwood near Gatwick Airport.
  - The Telegraph reports that every newborn baby in the UK will have their DNA mapped in order to assess potential health risks.
  - A British man is reported to have been arrested in Cyprus on spying and terrorism charges after allegedly carrying out surveillance for Iran on the RAF Akrotiri base.
  - A British woman is seriously ill in hospital after contracting Legionnaires' disease while on holiday in Greece.
- 22 June – Starmer calls on Iran to "return to the negotiating table" after US airstrikes on nuclear sites in the country overnight.
- 23 June
  - Home Secretary Yvette Cooper announces that the direct action protest network Palestine Action is to be banned on anti-terrorism grounds after members broke into RAF Brize Norton during a protest and vandalised two aircraft.
  - Health Secretary Wes Streeting announces a national inquiry into maternity care in England.
  - The weight loss drug Mounjaro becomes available through GP surgeries in England, but with strict guidelines as to who will qualify for the injection.
- 24 June
  - Twelve-Day War: The first Britons evacuated from Israel land back in the UK at Birmingham Airport.
  - 2025 NATO summit: Starmer says that the UK will meet a NATO target of spending 5% of GDP on defence by 2035.
  - The UK government announces plans to purchase 12 new F-35A fighter jets capable of carrying nuclear bombs, which will join NATO's nuclear mission.
  - Lord Norman Foster is announced as the winner of a search to design a national memorial to Queen Elizabeth II.
  - Online customers have expressed their anger with clothes retailer Asos after some received emails telling them they had been banned for sending back too many returns.
  - French authorities charge a British sex offender, Jacky Jarj, in connection with the "mock wedding" of a nine-year-old Ukrainian girl at Disneyland Paris.
  - A UK government security document warns that the UK must "actively prepare for the possibility" of "coming under direct threat, potentially in a wartime scenario".
- 25 June – 37-year-old Marcus Monzo is found guilty of murdering 14-year-old schoolboy Daniel Anjorin in the Hainault sword attack of April 2024. He is also found guilty of attempting to murder two other local residents and a police officer.
- 26 June
  - The Medicines and Healthcare products Regulatory Agency and Genomics England begin a study into the effects of weight loss injections following several hundred reports of pancreatic problems among people who have had the injections.
  - Two Metropolitan Police officers are dismissed after a disciplinary hearing was told they conducted a "humiliating" strip search on a 15-year-old girl.
  - The UK Health Security Agency issues an amber heat health alert for parts of England from 12pm on 27 June to 6pm on 1 July, with temperatures forecast to reach 30 °C on 29 and 30 June.
- 27 June
  - Marcus Monzo is sentenced to life imprisonment with a minimum term of 40 years.
  - In the third U-turn in a month, Starmer announces amendments to his government's planned welfare changes in an attempt to head off a rebellion by backbench Labour MPs.
  - The UK government announces a loosening of its travel advice for Israel ahead of the last scheduled evacuation flight from Tel Aviv, due to depart on 29 June.
- 28 June
  - A seven-year-old girl is killed and another critically injured after a tree falls on a group of children at Chalkwell Park, Southend-on-Sea.
  - The Border Force seizes 2.4 metric tons of cocaine worth £96 million (US$132 million) from a ship from Panama at the London Gateway, reportedly one of the country's largest drug bust.
- 29 June – A Freedom of Information request reveals a sharp increase in the number of callouts received by the National Tactical Response Group, which deals with serious prison incidents in England and Wales, during 2024, with 823 deployments that year compared to 570 in 2022.
- 30 June
  - Following a trial at Bristol Crown Court, 92-year-old convicted rapist Ryland Headley is found guilty of the 1967 murder of Louisa Dunne. The case is reported to be the UK's oldest solved cold case.
  - Avon and Somerset Police launch a criminal investigation to determine whether comments relating to Palestine made by rap duo Bob Vylan and rap group Kneecap at their respective Glastonbury Festival concerts constituted a criminal offence.
  - The Radio Teleswitch Service, which uses a radio signal to communicate with some older electricity meters, enabling them to switch between peak and off-peak settings, and is transmitted by the BBC on 198KHz long wave alongside BBC Radio 4, begins being turned off.

=== July ===
- 1 July
  - The final day of a heatwave is marked by the UK's highest temperatures of 2025 so far, with 35.8 °C (96.4 °F) recorded in Faversham, Kent.
  - Following last-minute concessions, MPs vote by 335 to 260 in favour of the Universal Credit and Personal Independence Payment Bill, meaning it will progress to the next stage of parliamentary scrutiny.
  - 92-year-old Ryland Headley is sentenced to life imprisonment with a minimum term of 20 years for the murder of Louisa Dunne in 1967, meaning that because of his age he will likely spend the rest of his life in prison.
  - TSB is sold to Santander in a deal worth £2.65bn.
  - Marks & Spencer confirms its online retail operations should be fully restored by August.
  - Dyfed-Powys Police recover the body of Labour Party peer Lord David Lipsey from the River Wye at Glasbury, Powys, after receiving a concerned call about a man swimming in the river the previous day.
- 2 July
  - The Bank of England launches a month-long consultation to replace historical figures with new features for the next design of Series H banknotes. The reported ideas include British birds, bridges, bangers and mash, nature, innovation, or key events in history.
  - Chancellor Rachel Reeves is seen in tears during Prime Minister's Questions. When asked about her emotional state, a spokesperson tells the BBC: "It's a personal matter, which – as you would expect – we are not going to get into."
  - Starmer announces plans to "fundamentally rewire" the NHS in England with the establishment of a series of local treatment centres to move healthcare away from hospitals and into the community.
  - Admiral Sir Ben Key is dismissed from the Royal Navy following an investigation into his conduct, which found he had "fallen far short of the values and standards expected of service personnel".
  - MPs vote 385–26 to proscribe the group Palestine Action.
  - A report into the Hayes substation fire, which caused flights to be suspended at Heathrow Airport, finds that it occurred as the result of a fault that had been known about for several years.
- 3 July
  - The Prime Minister, the Prince and Princess of Wales, and fans pay tribute to footballer Diogo Jota, following his death in a car crash at the age of 28. Liverpool FC, for whom Jota played as a forward, say they are "devastated" by the "unimaginable loss".
  - Home Secretary Yvette Cooper describes MI5's false evidence given to a number of courts as a "serious failing".
- 4 July
  - Tyler Webb, who "repeatedly and persistently" encouraged a vulnerable woman he met online to kill herself, is sentenced to nine years and four months in custody. The conviction, reported to be the first of its kind in the UK, will see Webb detained in a psychiatric facility, and moved to a prison if he is deemed fit enough.
  - Oasis begin their five-month reunion tour in Cardiff, the band's first live concerts in 16 years. The UK leg of the tour ended on 9 August in Edinburgh.
  - Palestine Action loses a High Court challenge to temporarily block the UK government from proscribing it as a terrorist group, meaning it will become a banned organisation from the following day.
- 5 July
  - Police arrest 29 people following a central London protest in support of Palestine Action on its first day as a proscribed terrorist group.
  - Black Sabbath's final concert, Back to the Beginning, takes place at Villa Park in Birmingham. The event raises £140m for local charities.
- 7 July
  - A memorial service is held at St Paul's Cathedral, attended by Prime Minister Keir Starmer and the Duke and Duchess of Edinburgh, to mark the 20th anniversary of the 7/7 London bombings.
  - The UK government announces that the UK Emergency Alert System will be tested again in September.
  - Former paramedic Stephen Doohan, who secretly gave his partner drugs to induce an abortion, is sentenced to ten and a half years in prison.
  - The UK government is set to amend the Employment Rights Bill to allow parents who experience a miscarriage before 24 weeks a week's bereavement leave from work.
- 8 July
  - Sir Wyn Williams' first report into the Horizon IT scandal is released, concluding that the scandal had a "disastrous" effect on those wrongly accused of and prosecuted for criminal offences.
  - A public inquiry into the 2024 Southport stabbing, chaired by Sir Adrian Fulford, opens at Liverpool Town Hall.
  - The Department for Culture, Media and Sport announces that the Bayeux Tapestry will be loaned to the UK and go on display at the British Museum during 2026.
  - The BBC dismisses Gregg Wallace as presenter of MasterChef after a further 50 complaints emerged concerning his behaviour.
  - The UK government announces that it will remove proposed legislation from the Renters Rights' Bill that would allow landlords in England to require tenants to take out specific insurance if they own pets.
  - Monzo Bank is fined £21m by the Financial Conduct Authority after allowing customers to register fake addresses, such as 10 Downing Street and Buckingham Palace.
  - MPs vote 415–98 to approve the Football Governance Bill that will establish a regulatory body for the top five tiers of English football.
- 9 July
  - 2025 Birmingham bin strike: Talks between Birmingham City Council and refuse workers break down.
  - A report by Brian Leveson recommends jury-free trials.
  - Sir Brian Langstaff's report into the infected blood scandal is published. Langstaff says that thousands of victims of the scandal are being "harmed further" by a lengthy wait for compensation.
  - Resident doctors in England vote in favour of strike action.
- 10 July
  - Keir Starmer and Emmanuel Macron announce a new one in, one out migration deal between the UK and France.
  - A report published by the House of Commons Security and Intelligence Committee says that the UK faces a "rising" and unpredictable threat from Iran and warns the government must do more to counter it.
  - The National Crime Agency arrests four people, including a Latvian national, for conducting cyberattacks as part of an organized crime ring against national retailers Marks & Spencer, Harrod's, and Co-op Food.
- 11 July
  - Office for National Statistics data indicates the UK economy unexpectedly shrank in May, with the 0.1% retraction due to a fall in manufacturing, and making it the second month in a row during which the economy shrank.
  - The UK Health Security Agency issues an amber heat health alert for southern and eastern England, and the Midlands, effective from noon on Friday 11 July until Monday 14 July.
  - A hosepipe ban comes into force in Yorkshire, with Nicola Shaw, the chief executive of Yorkshire Water, suggesting it may be in place until the winter.
  - South East Water announces a hosepipe ban for Kent and Sussex starting on 18 July.
- 12 July
  - The Metropolitan Police confirm that 41 arrests have been made at a protest in central London against Palestine Action being proscribed as a terrorist organisation. Arrests are also made at protests in Cardiff and Manchester, with a total of 71 people detained from the three demonstrations.
  - The UK's third heatwave of 2025 peaks with a temperature of 33 °C recorded at Ross-on-Wye in Herefordshire.
  - 2025 Wimbledon Championships:
    - Poland's Iga Swiatek defeats America's Amanda Anisimova 6–0 6–0 to win the women's singles, taking just 57 minutes to win the game.
    - Julian Cash and Lloyd Glasspool become the first all-British pair to win the men's doubles since 1936 after defeating Australia's Rinky Hijikata and David Pel of the Netherlands 6–2 7–6 (7–3).
- 13 July
  - BBC News reports that a child has died from measles at Liverpool's Alder Hey Children's Hospital as the hospital says that cases of the illness are on the rise in the area and there has been an increase in "seriously unwell" children being admitted with measles.
  - Transport Secretary Heidi Alexander says that the UK government will make it easier for people to buy an electric car, but does not say how this will be achieved.
  - Four people are killed when a Beechcraft B200 aircraft crashes and explodes in a fireball, soon after taking off from London Southend Airport.
  - 2025 Wimbledon Championships:
    - Jannik Sinner wins the men's singles, defeating Carlos Alcaraz 4–6 6–4 6–4 6–4 to become the first Italian to win the contest.
    - Veronika Kudermetova and Elise Mertens win the women's doubles, defeating Hsieh Su-wei and Jelena Ostapenko 3–6 6–2 6–4.
  - Euro 2025: England defeat Wales 6–1 to secure a place in the quarter-finals.
- 14 July
  - Thames Water announces a hosepipe ban affecting 1.1 million customers in Gloucestershire, Oxfordshire, Berkshire and Wiltshire, from 22 July.
  - An independent investigation upholds 45 allegations against Gregg Wallace, mostly involving inappropriate language, but including one of unwelcome physical contact and three of being in a state of undress. A total of 83 allegations were made against the former MasterChef presenter.
  - As the third heatwave of 2025 draws to an end, a report from the Met Office warns that the UK is experiencing more extreme weather as a result of global warming.
  - The UK government announces that it will restart processing asylum claims from Syria seven months after they were paused fallowing the fall of the Assad regime.
  - The UK government announces a grant scheme to encourage people to buy electric vehicles that will reduce the purchase cost by up to £3,750.
  - Mark Gordon and Constance Martin are found guilty of gross negligence manslaughter over the death of their baby, Victoria, who died while they were on the run from authorities.
- 15 July
  - The Environment Agency declares a drought in the East and West Midlands regions.
  - It is revealed that several thousand Afghans have moved to the UK under a secret scheme established after a British official inadvertently leaked their data in February 2023.
  - Daniel Michael Graham and Adam Carruthers, who felled the Sycamore Gap tree in September 2023, are both sentenced to four years and three months in prison for criminal damage.
  - Data showing the immigration status of people claiming Universal Credit is published for the first time.
- 16 July
  - Office for National Statistics data shows UK inflation unexpectedly rose to 3.6% in June, its highest level since January 2024, with contributing factors including increases in food and clothing prices, as well as air and train fares.
  - Southern Water announces a hosepipe ban due to prolonged dry weather, affecting almost one million customers.
  - The Civil Aviation Authority lifts the ban on Pakistani airlines from landing in the UK due to significant improvements to aviation safety standards.
  - A review into the Prevent programme concludes that it missed opportunities to intervene in the lives of the killer of David Amess and the perpetrator of the Southport stabbings and potentially stop those crimes from being committed.
  - Co-op chief executive Shirine Khoury-Haq confirms that all 6.5 million of its members had data stolen during a cyberattack in April.
  - Air Marshall Harv Smyth is appointed as the next head of the Royal Air Force, and will succeed Air Chief Marshall Sir Richard Knighton in August when Knighton becomes Chief of the Defence Staff.
  - London Southend Airport reopens following a plane crash that killed four people.
  - The Court of Appeal rejects a request from the Solicitor General for Nicholas Prosper, sentenced to life imprisonment with a minimum term of 49 years for the murder of his family, to be given a whole life tariff.
  - It is reported that eight babies have been born in the UK using genetic material from three people in order to prevent inherited illness.
- 17 July
  - A plan to lower the voting age across the UK, enabling 1.5 million 16 and 17-year-olds to participate in the next general election, is announced by Deputy Prime Minister Angela Rayner. The proposal will form part of a new Elections Bill.
  - It is reported that the Afghan data leak that compromised the names of Afghans who had aided the UK also included the names of around 100 British officials, including members of MI6 and the SAS.
  - Office for National Statistics data shows unemployment has risen to 4.7%, while the annual rate of pay growth between March and May decreased to 5%.
  - The Met Office issues a yellow weather warning for thunderstorms for 18–19 July.
  - Isambard-AI, the UK's most powerful supercomputer, is made fully operational.
  - A 10-year-old boy is killed and 21 other people injured, two seriously, after a coach carrying children back from a school trip crashes near Minehead, Somerset.
  - Euro 2025: England go through to the semi-finals by winning against Sweden on penalties after drawing 2–2 following extra time.
- 18 July
  - Figures published by the Home Office indicate the UK government spent £2.1bn on hotels to house asylum seekers between April 2024 and April 2025, down from £3bn the previous year.
  - The Foreign Office says that a number of Russian spies have been sanctioned for conducting a "sustained campaign of malicious cyber activity" in the UK.
  - The UK Health Security Agency says that 38 cases of botulism poisoning have been recorded in England in the last six weeks after the suspected use of unlicensed Botox-like products.
- 19 July
  - More than 100 people are arrested at protests across the UK against the decision to proscribe Palestine Action as a terror group.
  - Thousands of premature babies are to be immunised against respiratory syncytial virus.
  - The UK government confirms its support for London's bid to stage the 2029 World Athletics Championships.
- 20 July – Passenger train operator c2c is renationalised.
- 21 July
  - The UK government launches an early review of the state-pension age, and revives the Pensions Commission, after saying that action is needed to prevent people retiring in 2050 from being worse off than those presently.
  - The UK government announces a national inquiry into the 1984 Battle of Orgreave between police and striking miners.
  - Publication of the Independent Water Commission report authored by Sir Jon Cunliffe, which argues water prices need to rise sharply following years of underinvestment.
  - Yostin Mosquera is convicted of the murders of Paul Longworth and Albert Alfonso, whose remains were discovered in suitcases at the Clifton Suspension Bridge in July 2024.
  - The UK issues a joint statement with 27 other countries calling for an immediate end to the Gaza war, saying it has "reached new depths" in terms of the suffering of civilians.
- 22 July
  - Office for National Statistics data shows UK government borrowing at £20.7bn in June, an increase of £6.6bn on June 2024, and higher than expected.
  - Kemi Badenoch performs a cabinet reshuffle, her first as Leader of the Opposition.
  - The cost of building the Sizewell C nuclear plant has increased from £20bn to £38bn, official figures reveal.
  - Following a trial at Winchester Crown Court, Howard Phillips is convicted of attempting to spy for Russian intelligence after passing personal details about former defence secretary Sir Grant Shapps to two people he believed were Russian agents.
  - Brewdog announces the closure of ten of its UK pubs, some within days.
  - UEFA Women's Euro 2025: The England women's national football team win 2–1 against Italy, with Chloe Kelly scoring a goal in the 119th minute, taking them through to the final.
- 23 July
  - Fans in the UK and around the world pay tribute to Ozzy Osbourne, frontman of Black Sabbath and pioneer of heavy metal, following his death the previous day.
  - Members of Cornwall County Council vote for Cornwall to become the fifth nation of the United Kingdom, putting it on a par with the other Celtic nations.
  - Former City traders Tom Hayes and Carlo Palombo, who were sent to prison following trials for manipulating the interest rates used for loans between banks, have their convictions quashed following appeal.
- 24 July
  - BBC News releases a joint statement alongside news agencies AP, AFP and Reuters, urging Israel "to allow journalists in and out of Gaza", amid ongoing reports of mass starvation in the region.
  - The UK and India sign a free trade deal worth £6 billion, following three years of negotiations, which also includes a commitment to tackling illegal immigration.
  - Former Labour leader Jeremy Corbyn confirms the launch of a new, as-yet-unnamed UK political party.
  - Office for National Statistics data indicates a 20% increase in incidents of shoplifting in the UK in the year to March 2025 when compared to the 12 month period up to March 2024. These figures are also the highest since records began.
- 25 July
  - Online Safety Act 2023: websites and apps begin imposing age verification on British users as part of government efforts to improve child safety online.
  - The Samaritans announce plans to close at least half of their 200 branches, saying the current size of the organisation is unsustainable.
  - US President Donald Trump arrives at Prestwick Airport to begin a four-day private visit to the United Kingdom during which he will meet Prime Minister Keir Starmer and First Minister of Scotland John Swinney.
  - An inquest into the death of Jay Slater finds that he died accidentally after falling down a ravine in Tenerife.
- 26 July
  - Using a method criticised by the UN and aid groups, the UK is to help Jordan drop aid into Gaza after Israel said it would allow other countries to deliver food supplies to the territory.
  - A cash offer from Hong Kong authorities to people who help in the arrest of pro-democracy activists living in the UK is condemned by the UK government.
- 27 July – Euro 2025: England beat Spain 3–1 on penalties, winning the final of the tournament. Their victory is the most watched television moment of the year so far, with a peak live audience of 12.2 million across all BBC platforms.
- 28 July
  - Two people are killed and two others are injured in a stabbing on Long Lane in Southwark, London. The two fatalities are subsequently named as father and son Terry and Brendan McMillan.
  - VPN apps, which can be used to bypass the requirements of the Online Safety Act which began being imposed on 25 July, become the most downloaded app type on Apple's App Store.
- 29 July
  - Euro 2025: 65,000 people watch the Lionesses as they hold an open-top bus parade through central London to celebrate their win.
  - A crowd of people observes a three minute silence in Southport on the first anniversary of the 2024 Southport stabbings.
- 30 July
  - A 20 minute technical problem at Air Traffic Control leads to a backlog of flights and huge flight disruption at UK airports.
  - Mohammed Fahir Amaaz is found guilty of attacking two female police officers during an incident at Manchester Airport in July 2024.
  - The High Court grants Palestine Action permission to challenge the UK government's decision to proscribe it as a terrorist group.
  - Office for National Statistics data indicates the population of England and Wales increased by 750,000 during the year preceding June 2024, largely attributed to migration.
  - The Most Reverend Cherry Vann is named as the new Archbishop of Wales, becoming the first woman elected as an Anglican archbishop in the UK and the first openly gay and partnered bishop to serve as a primate in the Anglican Communion.
- 31 July
  - 15-year-old Majd al-Shaghnobi becomes the first Gazan child to arrive in the UK for treatment for war injuries, and will undergo surgery to reconstruct his jaw at Great Ormond Street Children's Hospital.
  - Official data indicates that 25,000 migrants have crossed the English Channel so far during 2025.
  - Pope Leo XIV announces that St John Henry Newman, who was made a saint in the Catholic Church in 2019, will become a Doctor of the Church in recognition of the significance of his teachings. He will become the 38th Doctor of the Church, and the third to be associated with England, after the Venerable Bede and St Anselm of Canterbury.

=== August ===
- 1 August
  - Heathrow Airport reveals its expansion plans, including a third runway, at a cost of £49bn.
  - The Met Office issues a forecast for high winds and heavy rain ahead of the arrival of Storm Floris, scheduled to make landfall in the UK on 4 August.
  - Tuition fees in England and Wales increase to £9,535 per year.
  - Peter Phillips announces his engagement to NHS nurse Harriet Sperling.
  - The Supreme Court rules that some buyers who paid hidden costs on car loans will not be able to claim compensation.
  - Steven Knight is confirmed as the writer of the next James Bond film.
- 2 August
  - The UK government confirms that production has ended at the Lindsey Oil Refinery near Immingham, Lincolnshire, after it was taken into receivership in June following the collapse of the Prax Group.
  - The Police Federation describes a 4.2% pay increase from the UK government for police officers as one that "barely treads water".
- 3 August
  - The Met Office issues an amber weather warning for Scotland ahead of the arrival of Storm Floris.
  - An unmanned police helicopter operated by the National Police Air Service is tested in the UK for the first time.
- 5 August – Ofwat announces that its chief executive, David Black, will stand down from his role at the end of August.
- 6 August – The National Institute of Economic and Social Research says that Chancellor Rachel Reeves will need to raise taxes by £41.2bn in the next budget to meet her self-imposed spending targets.
- 7 August
  - The Bank of England cuts interest rates from 4.25% to 4%, taking the cost of borrowing to its lowest level for more than two years.
  - The first migrants are detained under the UK government's one in, one out agreement with France.
  - The Universities and Colleges Admissions Service (UCAS) says that a record number of 18-year-olds are likely to get into their university of choice this year, even if they do not have the required grades, because universities are keen to attract UK students because of "uncertainty" over numbers of international students.
  - Three people are charged with membership of Palestine Action following a protest in central London.
- 8 August
  - The UK Health Security Agency issues a yellow heat health alert for most of England from 12pm on Monday 11 August until 6pm on Wednesday 13 August when temperatures are forecast to go above 30 °C as the UK experiences its fourth heatwave of the summer.
  - The National Crime Agency is to take over an investigation into allegations that South Yorkshire Police officers sexually abused children in Rotherham.
  - The High Court approves River Island's plans to restructure its organisation, paving the way for the closure of another 33 outlets.
- 9 August
  - Police arrest 474 people at a demonstration in support of Palestine Action in central London.
  - The UK government announces plans to deport foreign criminals after they have received a custodial sentence.
- 10 August
  - The number of people arrested following the previous day's Palestine Action protest in London rises to 532.
  - Around 60 foreign Transport for London staff could face deportation because of rule changes regarding salary thresholds for skilled worker visas that mean they no longer qualify for visa sponsorship.
- 11 August
  - The UK Health Security Agency issues an amber heat health alert for the East Midlands, West Midlands, East of England, London, and the South East, lasting from 9am on 12 August until 6pm on 13 August.
  - The UK government outlines plans to overhaul driving laws in England and Wales.
  - A body found in a melting Antarctic glacier in January is identified as that of Dennis Bell, who worked for the organisation that became the British Antarctic Survey, and disappeared after falling into a crevasse in 1959.
- 12 August
  - Office for National Statistics data indicates an increase in UK unemployment in the three months up to June 2025 although the official rate of 4.7%, a four-year high, was unchanged from the previous quarter.
  - The number of migrants to cross the English Channel since Labour came to power in the July 2024 general election surpasses 50,000.
  - 2025 United Kingdom heatwaves: Northolt in London records the highest temperature of the day at 33.4 °C.
- 13 August
  - The National Police Chiefs Council issues guidelines encouraging police to consider disclosing the ethnicity and nationality of suspects charged in high-profile cases as a means of preventing the spread of misinformation online.
  - The fashion accessories retailer Claire's goes into administration in the UK and Ireland.
  - Three children appear in court after being charged with murder on the Isle of Sheppey in Kent.
  - Keir Starmer pays tribute to Hefin David, 47, after the Welsh Labour MS was found dead at a property in Nelson, Caerphilly.
  - The UK Health Security Agency extends the yellow heat health alert to last from 6pm on 13 August until 6pm on 18 August, with the alert covering Yorkshire and The Humber, the East Midlands, the West Midlands, the East of England, London, the South East, and South West.
  - Hashem Abedi is charged with the attempted murder of three prison officers, and the assault of a fourth, following an incident at HMP Frankland on 11 April.
  - Data published by Moneyfacts indicates the average two-year mortgage rate has fallen below 5% for the first time since the September 2022 mini-budget, with a figure of 4.99%.
- 14 August
  - Office for National Statistics data indicates that UK economic growth slowed to 0.3% during the second quarter of 2025, compared to 0.7% in the first quarter, although the figure is better than forecasters had predicted.
  - A Level results are published for England, Wales and Northern Ireland, with 28.3% of students achieving A* or A grades, an increase from 27.8% in 2024.
  - A five-fold increase in Octopus vulgaris numbers off the coasts of Devon and Cornwall is reported in the government's annual fisheries survey, threatening local populations of crab, scallop and lobster, which they prey on, and which the fishing industry depends on. Global warming is reported to be driving the animals from the Mediterranean into UK waters.
- 15 August
  - A remembrance service takes place at the National Memorial Arboretum in Staffordshire to mark the 80th anniversary of VJ Day, with the King, Queen and 33 veterans of the Far East Campaign in attendance.
  - BBC News reports that the number of data centres in the UK is set to increase by a fifth from the current number of 477 as the growth in artificial intelligence increases demand for them.
  - Associated British Foods, owners of the Kingsmill brands of bread, have agreed to buy rivals Hovis, creating the UK's largest bread manufacturer.
- 16 August
  - It is announced that clothing retailer Topshop is to make a return to the high street, five years after its parent company, Arcadia Group, collapsed.
  - A data breach at a Ministry of Defence subcontractor jeopardises the safety of several thousand Afghans brought to the UK for their safety after details are stolen for a second time.
- 17 August
  - The BBC asks police to investigate allegations published by The Sun on Sunday that two Strictly Come Dancing stars used cocaine on the show during the 2024 series.
  - In an article for The Irish Times, author Sally Rooney says she will continue to support Palestine Action despite it having been proscribed as a terrorist group by the UK government.
- 19 August
  - The Court of Appeal receives an application on behalf of Constance Marten to appeal against her conviction for gross negligence manslaughter over the death of her daughter, Victoria.
  - Ashvir Singh Johal becomes the first Sikh to take charge of a professional British football club with his appointment as manager of Morecambe F.C..
- 20 August – Inflation rises by more than expected, from 3.6% to 3.8%, its highest level since January 2024.
- 21 August
  - Publication of this year's GCSE results for students in England, Wales and Northern Ireland. The pass rate of 67.4% for students achieving 4/C and above is down from the 67.8% achieved in 2024.
  - Speciality Steels UK, the UK's third largest steel manufacturer, is taken into government control after going into insolvency.
  - Home Office figures show there were a record 111,000 applications for asylum in the UK in the year up to June 2025, 14% up on the previous year, and that the government is now processing applications faster. The previous high was in 2002 when there were 103,000 applications.
  - National flags begin appearing across cities in England and Scotland, in what is described as a campaign named Operation Raise the Colours.
  - Supercentanarian and world's oldest living person, Ethel Caterham (born 21 August 1909), celebrates her 116th birthday, becoming the first British person to ever do so.
- 22 August
  - Istiorachis macarthurae, a species of dinosaur discovered on the Isle of Wight, has been named after Dame Ellen MacArthur.
  - TikTok announces plans to make a number of its UK content moderators redundant in favour of moving jobs to Europe and increasing the use of artificial intelligence to moderate content.
  - Five people are hospitalised, with three in a life-threatening condition, after a suspected arson attack at a restaurant in east London.
  - Labour foreign secretary, David Lammy, escapes a fine and is given a formal warning by the Environment Agency after admitting to fishing illegally when he went angling without a rod licence with US vice president, JD Vance, during Vance's holiday in the UK.
  - A star of Strictly Come Dancing is arrested by the Metropolitan Police on suspicion of rape and "non-consensual intimate image abuse", before being released the next day.
- 22 August to 27 September – England is hosting the 2025 Women's Rugby World Cup.
- 23 August – A number of anti-immigration protests are held in locations across the UK, along with counter protests in support of migrants.
- 24 August – Home Secretary Yvette Cooper announces an overhaul of the UK's immigration system to shorten the time asylum seekers are waiting to hear about their applications and reduce the number of people being housed in hotels.
- 25 August
  - Three people are killed and one seriously injured in a helicopter crash on the Isle of Wight.
  - Parts of the UK record their warmest August Bank Holiday on record, with Hawarden on the England–Wales border reaching a temperature of 29.6 °C.
- 26 August
  - Provisional statistics released by the Met Office suggest the summer of 2025 was "almost certainly" the warmest on record.
  - Figures show food inflation at 4.2% for August 2025, with the cost of items such as chocolate, butter and eggs helping to drive food price inflation to its highest in 18 months.
  - Poundland is saved from closure after a restructuring plan is approved by the High Court.
- 27 August
  - Ofgem confirms that gas and electricity prices will rise by 2% – an annual equivalent of £35 for an average household – from 1 October. The rise is slightly more than experts had forecast.
  - Royal Mail announces it is introducing 3,500 solar-powered post boxes across the UK, which will contain a drawer that allows small parcels to be posted.
  - A record low fertility rate for the UK is reported by the ONS. Data for 2024 shows England and Wales now at 1.41 and Scotland at 1.25.
- 28 August
  - The UK Foreign Office tells Russia to "stop this senseless killing" after strikes on Kyiv kill at least 19 people, including four children.
  - Eli Lilly, the company behind the weight loss drug Mounjaro offers a discounted deal to UK suppliers, limiting a price increase that comes into effect from September.
- 29 August
  - Share prices in UK banks fall after the Institute for Public Policy Research urges the UK government to introduce a tax on banking profits that it says would raise £8bn a year.
  - The NHS will offer all young children in the UK a vaccine for chickenpox from January 2026, with two doses given at twelve and eighteen months.
  - Conservatives call for an inquiry into whether the deputy prime minister, Angela Rayner, broke the Ministerial Code after it is reported she saved £40,000 in stamp duty by telling tax authorities that the flat that she was buying in Hove was to be her main home.
- 30 August – Large groups of pro- and anti-immigration protestors gather outside the Cladhan Hotel in Falkirk, the second large-scale protest in the town within a month. Three arrests are made.
- 31 August
  - The UK secures a deal worth £10bn to supply at least five new Type 26 frigates to the Norwegian Navy.
  - Jaguar Land Rover suspends car production following a cyber attack. Production does not resume until 7 October.
  - The UK Health Security Agency reports the death of a baby from whooping cough between January and June, the first of 2025. It also reports that the baby's mother was not vaccinated against whooping cough while she was pregnant.
  - Data relating to school attendance shows that more than half of pupils who missed the first week of school went on to be "persistently absent" in 2024, compared to 14% who attended for the first week.
  - The Lewes pound, the last surviving UK local currency, is discontinued.

=== September ===
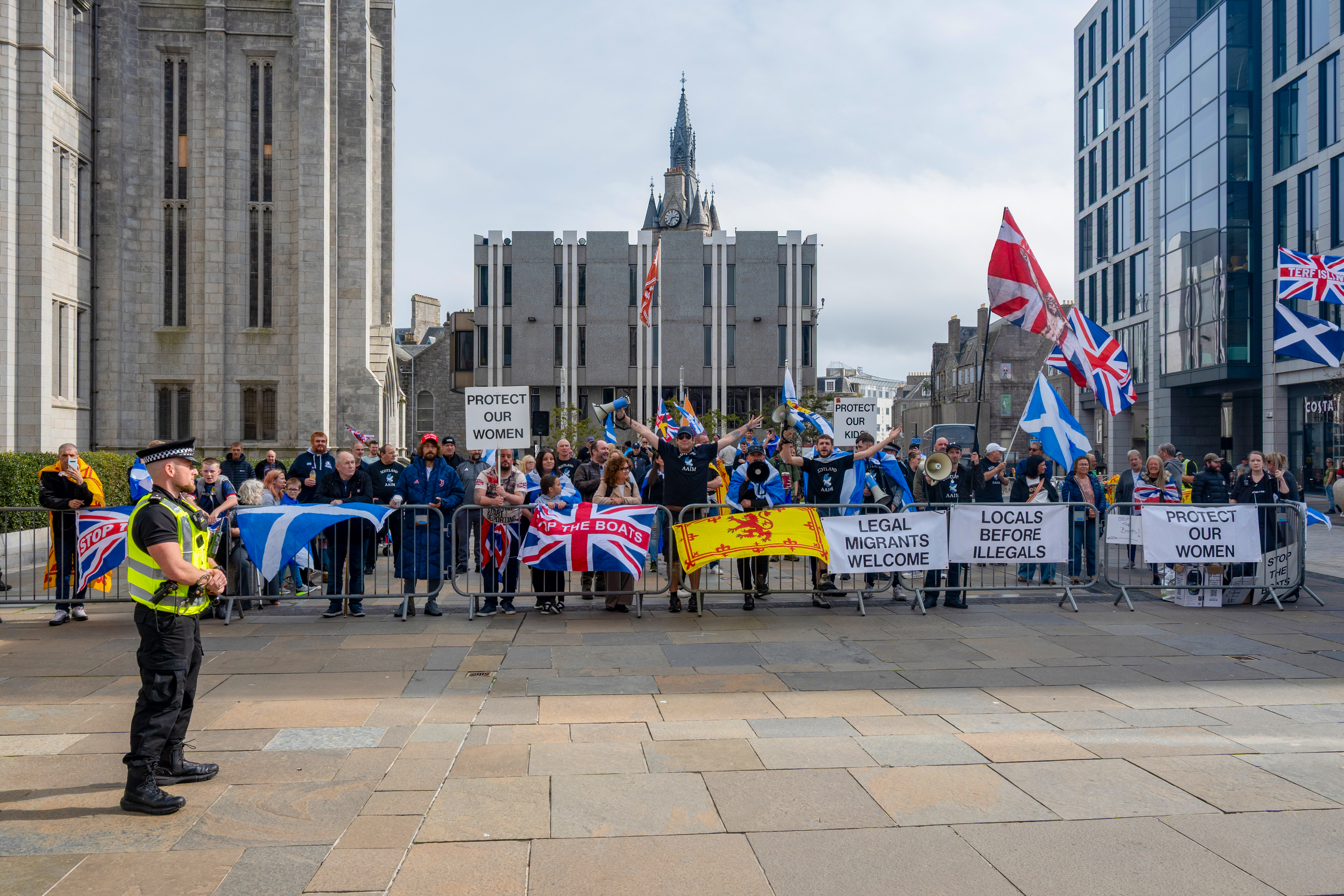
- September: Continued protests throughout the UK as part of the 2025 British anti-immigration protests.
  1 September
  - The UK government temporarily suspends new applications for a scheme that allows refugees to bring their families to the UK.
  - Data produced by Nationwide Building Society indicates house prices in August 2025 had fallen by 2.1% compared to August 2024, with the month-on-month change 0.1% lower than July 2025.
- 2 September
  - The UK's long term borrowing cost reaches its highest level since 1998.
  - The Home Office launches a new campaign to discourage foreign students not to overstay their visas. They will be contacted directly by the government and told they will be removed from the UK if they overstay their visas.
  - Graham Linehan, a co-creator of the sitcom Father Ted, is arrested by five armed police officers at Heathrow Airport on suspicion of inciting violence in relation to posts he made on X.
  - The Parole Board confirms it will consider whether to release Jon Venables, one of the killers of James Bulger, from prison.
  - Sainsbury's confirms it is to trial facial recognition technology in its stores in order to identify shoplifters.
- 3 September – It is confirmed that Topshop will return to the high street in February 2026, with branches opening in 32 John Lewis stores. The Topman brand will also return in six stores.
- 4 September
  - Seventeen people are injured, with fifteen requiring hospital treatment, after a route 24 bus mounts a pavement near Victoria station in central London.
  - A BBC News investigation suggests that at least 55,000 people in England may have been misdiagnosed with type 2 diabetes because of errors caused by a type of machine used by some hospitals to diagnose the condition.
  - The Home Office is granted permission to appeal against the High Court ruling that allows Palestine Action to challenge the UK government's decision to proscribe it as a terrorist organisation.
- 5 September
  - Angela Rayner resigns as both Deputy Prime Minister and Deputy Leader of the Labour Party after admitting underpaying stamp duty on her £800,000 home in Hove, East Sussex.
  - Starmer performs a cabinet reshuffle. The changes include David Lammy appointed as the new Deputy PM, while Yvette Cooper becomes Foreign Secretary.
  - A Reform UK conference is held at the Birmingham NEC.
  - Buckingham Palace announces the death of Katharine, Duchess of Kent, the oldest member of the Royal Family, at the age of 92.
  - Three British nationals are confirmed to be among the 16 fatalities in the Lisbon funicular crash.
  - Actor John Alford, who appeared in London's Burning and Grange Hill, is found guilty of sexually assaulting two girls aged 14 and 15. He is told to expect a jail sentence in December.
  - Beauty retailer Bodycare goes into administration, and announces the immediate closure of 32 of its outlets with the loss of 450 jobs.
- 6 September
  - More than 425 people are arrested at a demonstration in Parliament Square against the government's ban of the campaign group Palestine Action.
  - A fire breaks out at Television Centre, London.
  - A Royal Catholic funeral is announced for Katharine, Duchess of Kent.
  - A former Victorian church collapses in Cleckheaton, West Yorkshire.
  - 1,101 migrants cross the English Channel in a single day, this being the second day in 2025 that more than 1,000 people crossed.
- 7 September
  - The number of people arrested at the Palestine Action demonstration held the previous day grows to 890.
  - London Underground workers begin a strike, their first since March 2023, over pay and conditions. Disruption is expected to impact the network until Friday 12 September.
  - At exactly 15:00, the UK Emergency Alert System is tested and broadcast to all mobile phones in the country.
  - London-born Carlo Acutis is canonised by Pope Leo XIV as the first millennial saint.
- 8 September
  - Organisers of the 2025 Great North Run apologise after an error in the production of medals given to participants meant they showed a picture of the wrong location.
  - A mural by street artist Banksy depicting a judge beating a protester appears at the Royal Courts of Justice.
- 9 September
  - A message from Peter Mandelson, the UK's ambassador to the United States, is included in a "birthday book" of messages to convicted paedophile Jeffrey Epstein released by the US Congress.
  - Prince Harry donates £1.1m to Children in Need.
  - Former MasterChef presenter Gregg Wallace is launching a legal case against the BBC over a data protection claim.
- 10 September
  - UK Defence Minister John Healey condemns the Russian drone incursion into Poland, the first to hit NATO territory. He tells reporters that the British Armed Forces will "look at options to bolster" air defence over Poland.
  - The University of Kent and University of Greenwich will merge in 2026 to create the UK's first "super university", BBC News reports.
  - Sir Andy Cooke, His Majesty's Chief Inspector of Constabulary, has said that police should stop recording non-crime hate incidents.
  - Horse racing in Great Britain: The British Horseracing Authority holds a one-day strike against a proposed increase on betting taxes from 15% to 21%. This is the first time in modern history the sport has voluntarily refused to race, cancelling events at Lingfield Park, Carlisle, Uttoxeter, and Kempton.
  - Jaguar Land Rover confirms that some data was stolen during the recent cyber attack.
  - London North Eastern Railway confirms some customer details have been accessed during a cyber attack, and urges customers to be vigilant.
  - Prince Harry meets King Charles III at Clarence House, the first time they have met since February 2024.
  - Starmer comes under pressure to sack the UK's ambassador to the United States, Peter Mandelson, following revelations related to Mandelson's relationship with late convicted paedophile Jeffrey Epstein.
- 11 September – Peter Mandelson is sacked from the post of UK Ambassador to the United States following revelations about his relationship with Jeffrey Epstein.
- 12 September
  - Office for National Statistics data shows the UK economy experienced zero growth in July, down from 0.4% in June, following the largest contraction in manufacturing output in a year. Over the three months to July, economic growth was 0.2%.
  - Manchester Metropolitan University strips Peter Mandelson of the honorary doctorate given to him upon his appointment as Chancellor in 2016, and the commemorative medal given to him at the end of his tenure in 2024.
  - The Met Office issues a yellow weather warning for wind and rain for most of England and Wales covering Sunday 14 September and Monday 15 September.
  - AstraZeneca pauses plans to invest £200m in a facility in Cambridge, the plans of which were announced in March 2024.
- 13 September – Around 150,000 people take part in the "Unite the Kingdom" rally through central London organised by far-right activist Tommy Robinson, with a counter-protest by anti-racism campaigners also taking place. The Metropolitan Police reports that 26 police officers have been injured in violent clashes, with 25 arrests made.
- 14 September
  - The National Gallery announces plans to expand with the construction of another wing following private donations of £375m.
  - Little Arboreal Ladybirds are recorded in the UK for the first time, with sightings in the New Forest. The habitat of the insects is believed to have shifted north from France and continental Europe, due to a warming climate.
- 15 September
  - Constance Marten and Mark Gordon are sentenced at the Old Bailey over the death of their baby Victoria, who died in 2023. Both receive prison sentences of 14 years, with Gordon being given a further four-year extension.
  - Defence Secretary John Healey confirms that RAF Typhoon jets will join NATO in helping to defend Polish airspace following the previous week's incursion by Russian drones.
  - The Royal College of Defence Studies announces it will exclude Israeli students from attending starting in the 2026–27 academic year, calling on the Israeli government to de-escalate its offensive in Gaza with an immediate ceasefire.
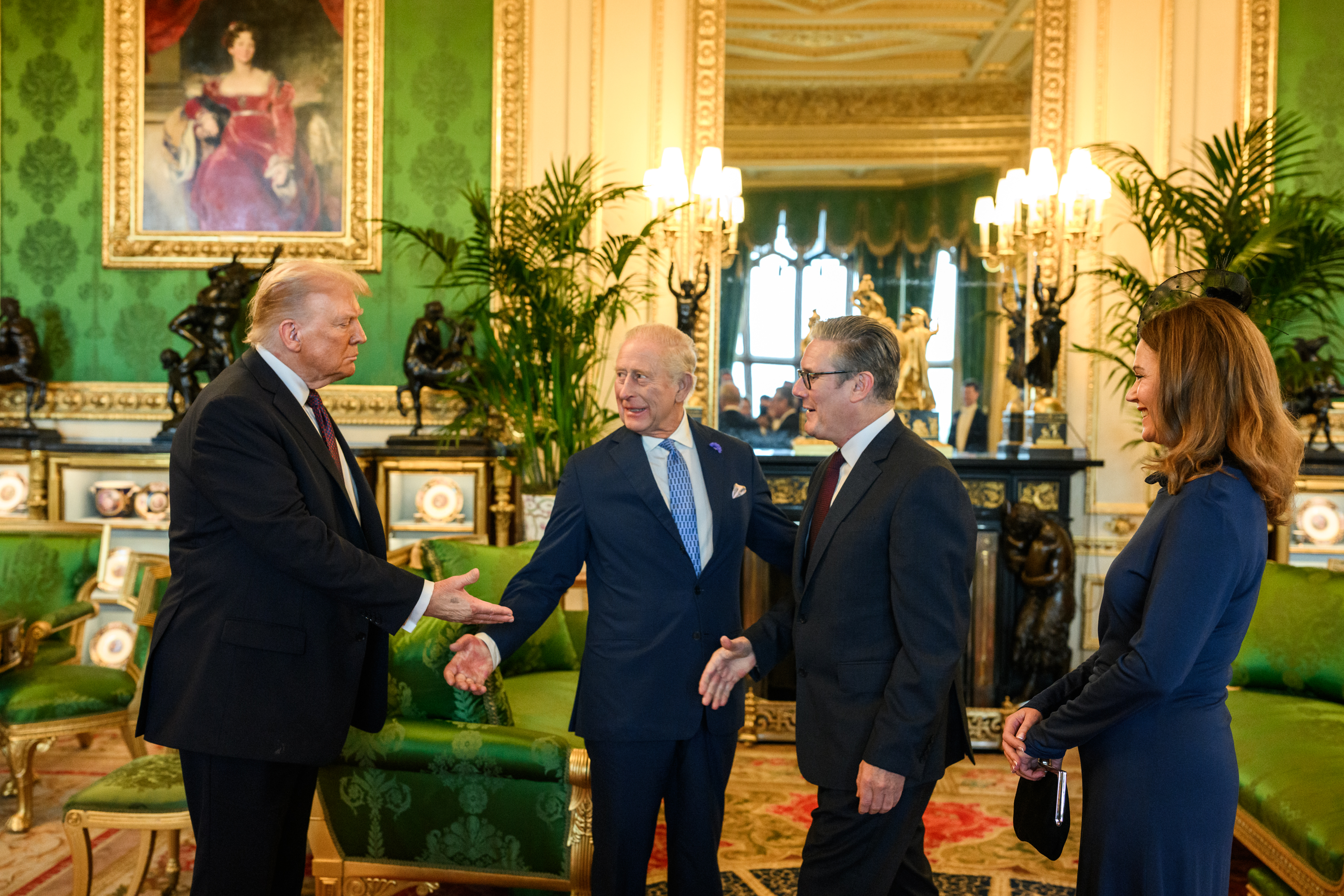
- Donald Trump, Charles III, Keir and Victoria Starmer (from left to right) at Windsor Castle
  16–18 September – The second state visit of US President Donald Trump to the United Kingdom takes place.
- 16 September
  - The first Catholic funeral for a member of the Royal Family in modern times takes place following the death of Katharine, Duchess of Kent on 4 September.
  - An Eritrean man who arrived in the UK by crossing the English Channel on a small boat wins a last-minute legal claim to temporarily block his removal to France.
  - Sky UK launches a consultation over plans to cut 600 jobs as it focuses on its streaming services.
- 17 September
  - UK inflation remains at 3.8%.
  - MSPs approve changes to Scottish law that includes removing the "not proven" verdict as an option for juries in Scottish legal cases.
- 18 September
  - Two men and a woman are arrested in Essex on suspicion of spying for Russia.
  - The Bank of England holds its baseline interest rate unchanged at 4%, as widely expected by economists.
  - The first migrants are deported to France under the "one in, one out" agreement with the UK.
- 19 September
  - Office for National Statistics data shows UK government borrowing at £18bn for August 2025, the highest August figure for five years, and higher than experts had forecast.
  - Elderly British couple Peter and Barbie Reynolds, detained in Afghanistan by the Taliban in February, are released after Qatari mediation.
  - Secretary of State for Northern Ireland Hilary Benn and Tánaiste Simon Harris announce a new UK and Irish deal on the legacy of the Troubles to replace the Northern Ireland Troubles (Legacy and Reconciliation) Act, with Harris describing the new framework as "a big step forward".
  - An Eritrean migrant is deported to France after losing a legal case against his deportation. In return, France is expected to send a replacement migrant to the UK within a few days.
  - 1,072 migrants cross the English Channel in one day using 13 boats. This is the third day in 2025 that more than 1,000 people have crossed, bringing the total crossing so far in 2025 to a record of 32,103.
  - The Terminally Ill Adults (End of Life) Bill passes its second reading in the House of Lords.
- 20 September
  - A number of flights at Heathrow Airport are delayed following a cyberattack on software used for electronic check in and baggage services. The cyberattack has affected a number of European airports.
  - RAF fighter jets conduct a NATO air defence mission over Poland.
- 21 September
  - The UK announces its formal recognition of Palestine as a sovereign state.
  - Justice Secretary David Lammy announces that a further 10,000 prison officers will be supplied with body armour following a number of high profile attacks on prison staff.
  - Transport Secretary Heidi Alexander approves plans for a second runway at Gatwick Airport.
  - The Sun on Sunday and The Mail on Sunday publish an email alleged to have been sent by Sarah, Duchess of York to Jeffrey Epstein in 2011 in which he was described as a "supreme friend".
- 22 September
  - Several charities remove the Duchess of York as their patron, following the previous day's allegation, saying it would be "inappropriate" for her to continue.
  - The UK's remaining Bodycare stores are to close with the loss of 444 jobs after the retailer failed to find a buyer.
  - Launch of the Dame Hilary Mantel Prize for Fiction, a prize open to unpublished writers living in the UK and Ireland.
  - Following diplomatic efforts by the UK government, British-Egyptian writer Alaa Abd El-Fattah is freed from prison after serving a six-year sentence for sharing a Facebook post.
- 23 September
  - Jaguar Land Rover confirms production at its facilities will not resume until at least 1 October.
  - Health Secretary Wes Streeting urges pregnant women to ignore suggestions from US President Donald Trump that taking Tylenol – better known in the UK as paracetamol – could lead to their children developing autism.
  - The Organisation for Economic Co-operation and Development forecasts that the UK will have the highest rate of inflation among the G7 nations in 2025.
  - Which? launches a supercomplaint against the insurance industry over its policy for paying out on claims.
  - The Home Office is refused permission to appeal against a temporary injunction blocking an Eritrean man from being removed to France.
  - Amazon announce they are to close their 19 UK grocery stores.
  - Daniel Bannister, previously convicted of stalking Cheryl Tweedy, is given a custodial sentence for breaking a restraining order.
- 24 September
  - A breakthrough in treating Huntington's disease is reported by UK doctors, with a new gene therapy able to slow its progression by 75 percent.
  - A man is arrested in the UK in connection with a cyberattack that has caused several days of disruption to several European airports, including Heathrow.
  - Home Secretary Shabana Mahmood orders an urgent review into the use and cost of taxis to transfer asylum seekers from their hotels to appointments following a BBC investigation into the matter.
  - Publication of a report by Angus McCullough KC that highlights a number of instances of how the Police Service of Northern Ireland used journalists' phone numbers to check for potential leaks of information by its officers and staff. However, the report states that the practice was not "widespread or systemic".
  - A report published by Oxford Economics indicates that YouTube content creators contributed £2.2bn to the UK economy in 2024.
  - Plans for Northern Powerhouse Rail are further delayed, meaning they will not be announced at the 2025 Labour Party Conference as scheduled.
  - The first migrants arrive in the UK legally as part of the one in, one out agreement with France.
- 26 September
  - Starmer announces plans for a Digital ID scheme that would be required for people to work in the UK.
  - Prince Andrew is named in the latest batch of files to be released by the Jeffrey Epstein estate.
- 27 September
  - George Galloway, the leader of the Workers Party of Britain and a former MP, and his wife, the party's deputy chair, are detained for questioning by counter-terrorism police at Gatwick Airport. The Metropolitan Police said counter-terrorism officers stopped two people but that neither were arrested and they were later allowed to leave.
  - 2025 Women's Rugby World Cup: England defeat Canada 33–13 in the final to win their third Rugby World Cup tournament.
  - Two women have died while trying to cross the English Channel.
  - Harrods warns its customers that some of their data may have been stolen in a cyberattack.
  - The UK government is to underwrite a £1.5bn loan to Jaguar Land Rover to help support its suppliers following the cyberattack that has forced a temporary halt to production.
  - A petition on the Parliament.uk website calling for the UK government to scrap plans to introduce digital ID cards passes 2 million signatures.
- 28 September
  - Another person dies while trying to cross the English Channel.
  - The Metropolitan Police says that children and young people in London are being recruited by rogue states such as Russia and Iran to carry out crimes.
  - England's women's rugby union team celebrate their World Cup victory with a party at London's Battersea Power Station.
  - Merseyside Police make a number of arrests after Palestine Action protesters gather outside ACC Liverpool, the venue of the 2025 Labour Party Conference.
- 29 September
  - Zhimin Qian, a 47-year-old Chinese national, is convicted at Southwark Crown Court of illegally acquiring and possessing more than £5bn worth of Bitcoin, which she attempted to launder in the UK. The case is believed to be the single largest cryptocurrency seizure in the world, involving multiple jurisdictions.
- 30 September – COVID-19 in the United Kingdom: UK government officials report that two new variants of COVID-19 known as the Stratus and Nimbus strains are leading to an increase in cases of the illness.

=== October ===
- 1 October
  - The High Court rules that PPE Medpro, a consortium led by Michelle Mone's husband, Doug Barrowman, must pay back £122m for supplying non-compliant medical gowns during the COVID-19 pandemic.
  - Mohammed Zahid, 65, the ringleader of a Rochdale grooming gang, is sentenced to 35 years in prison.
  - The Met Office issues a yellow severe weather alert for high winds and heavy rain ahead of the arrival of Storm Amy, the first named storm of the 2025–26 season, on Friday 3 October.
  - A ban on junk food advertising on British television before 9pm comes into force.
  - Blaise Metreweli takes over as chief of MI6, becoming the first woman to head the service in its 116-year history.
- 2 October
  - 2025 Manchester synagogue attack: Two people are killed, another three are injured, and a suspect is shot dead by police, in a car and knife attack at the Heaton Park Hebrew Congregation Synagogue in Manchester. Keir Starmer condemns the attack, which occurred on Yom Kippur, and cuts short a trip to Denmark to chair a COBRA meeting in London.
  - The Met Office warning for Storm Amy is upgraded to amber for much of northern and western Scotland.
- 3 October
  - Dame Sarah Mullally is named as the first female Archbishop of Canterbury, replacing Justin Welby following his resignation.
  - The two victims of the Manchester synagogue attack are named as Adrian Daulby and Melvin Cravitz.
- 4 October
  - The Metropolitan Police says that 335 people have been arrested at a pro-Palestinian demonstration in central London in support of the proscribed group Palestine Action.
  - Storm Amy:
    - The storm hits Scotland much harder than expected, causing widespread damage and leaving 42,000 properties without power.
    - A gust of 96 mph has been recorded overnight in the Inner Hebrides.
- 7 October
  - The Financial Conduct Authority announces that 14 million people who were mis-sold car finance between April 2007 and November 2024 could receive around £700 in compensation under plans from the regulator.
  - Jaguar Land Rover begins a phased relaunch of production at its UK facilities.
  - During a parole hearing, David Norris, one of the people convicted of the murder of Stephen Lawrence, admits to playing a role in the killing.
- 8 October – COVID-19 in the United Kingdom: Amid an uptick in COVID-19 infections, some NHS hospitals in England and Wales are reported to be urging patients and visitors to wear face masks.
- 9 October
  - Starmer responds to the news of Israel and Hamas agreeing to the first phase of the Gaza peace plan, describing it as "a moment of profound relief that will be felt all around the world, but particularly for the hostages, their families, and for the civilian population of Gaza, who have all endured unimaginable suffering over the last two years."
  - Former Radio 1 DJ Tim Westwood is charged with four counts of rape, nine counts of indecent assault, and two counts of sexual assault, relating to alleged offences against seven women between 1983 and 2016. He is due to appear at Westminster Magistrates' Court on 11 November.
  - Starmer signs a £350 million deal to supply India with lightweight multirole missiles. This follows Starmer's visit to Mumbai, meeting Indian prime minister, Narendra Modi. The missiles will be supplied from Thales Air Defence in Northern Ireland.
  - The water regulator Ofwat has agreed to allow Anglian Water, Northumbrian Water, Southern Water, Wessex Water and South East Water to increase their charges, meaning several million households face paying higher bills than expected.
- 10 October
  - A transgender woman is jailed for deception sex assault after being convicted of deceiving a heterosexual man into performing a sex act.
  - Thousands of mourners gather in Manchester for the funeral of former boxing world champion Ricky Hatton, who died aged 46 the previous month.
  - Fayaz Khan, who arrived in the UK in a small boat, is found guilty of threatening to kill Reform UK leader Nigel Farage on TikTok.
  - Home Secretary Yvette Cooper says there are "no plans" for British troops to be part of an international peacekeeping force monitoring the ceasefire in Gaza.
  - The UK government is to consult on whether children aged between 13 and 16 should be included in the implementation of digital ID cards.
  - The National Suicide Prevention Network is established by the Prince of Wales.
  - Hamit Coskun, who was fined for burning a copy of the Quran outside the Turkish consulate in London, wins an appeal against his conviction.
- 11 October
  - The Home Office announces that from December all new British passports issued will feature the Royal Coat of Arms of King Charles III.
  - West Yorkshire Police confirm that Lostprophets singer Ian Watkins, who was serving 29 years in prison for child sex offences, has died after being attacked at HMP Wakefield.
- 12 October – Passenger train operator Greater Anglia is renationalised.
- 13 October
  - Vodafone experiences a "major outage" impacting both broadband and mobile data throughout the UK.
  - MI5 warns MPs they are being targeted in espionage operations by Russia, China and Iran.
  - Two men are charged with murder in connection with the death of Lostprophets singer Ian Watkins.
- 14 October
  - The International Monetary Fund projects that for the UK in 2025: its economy will, at 1.3%, be the second fastest growing of the G7; economic output per person, growing by 0.4%, will be the lowest in the G7; living standards will improve at the slowest rate in the G7; price inflation will, at 3.4%, be the highest in the G7.
  - Fayaz Khan is sentenced to five years in prison following his conviction for threatening to kill Nigel Farage.
- 15 October
  - The UK government publishes witness statements submitted in the now-collapsed case against two men accused of spying for China.
  - Climate change in the United Kingdom: Independent climate advisers have said the UK should prepare to deal with extreme weather conditions brought about by a 2 °C rise in global temperatures by 2050.
  - The Information Commissioner's Office fines outsourcing firm Capita £14m after the personal data of 6.6m people was stolen during a 2023 cyberattack.
  - Russo-Ukrainian war: The UK announces fresh sanctions on Russia, targeting its largest oil companies and the country's "shadow fleet" of oil tankers.
- 16 October
  - The inquest into Ricky Hatton's death is opened at Stockport Coroner's Court, with a provisional cause of death given as suicide by hanging. The inquest is adjourned until 20 March 2026.
  - Office for National Statistics figures indicate the UK economy grew by 0.1% in August 2025.
  - Sam Fender wins the 2025 Mercury Prize for his third album, People Watching.
  - The British Library reissues a reader's card for Oscar Wilde 130 years after it was revoked following his conviction for "gross indecency".
  - Betting firm Paddy Power announces the closure of 57 outlets in the UK and Ireland.
  - Manchester's Heaton Park Hebrew Congregation Synagogue reopens two weeks after the attack.
  - Birmingham's Safety Advisory Group (SAG) has decided that fans of the Israeli football club Maccabi Tel Aviv should not be permitted to attend the club's Europa League fixture with Aston Villa F.C. on 6 November over safety concerns.
- 17 October
  - Prince Andrew announces he is relinquishing his royal titles, including that of Duke of York.
  - The Court of Appeal rejects a government attempt to block an appeal against the decision to proscribe Palestine Action as a terrorist group.
  - The HIV-prevention drug cabotegravir is approved for use by the NHS in England and Wales.
- 18 October – Protesters gather in central London to demonstrate against the introduction of digital ID cards.
- 19 October
  - The Metropolitan Police says it is "actively" looking into a Mail on Sunday report that Prince Andrew tried to use his personal protection officer to obtain personal information about Virginia Giuffre shortly before her initial accusations were made against him in February 2011.
  - Energy Secretary Ed Miliband tells the BBC's Sunday with Laura Kuenssberg programme that he expects up to 400,000 new jobs to be created in the UK's clean energy sector by 2030, as part of government plans to train and recruit more workers.
  - The UK government announces a new V-level qualification for 16-year-olds in England.
- 20 October
  - More than 1,000 companies, including many in the UK, are hit by a major Internet outage, caused by a system error at Amazon Web Services.
  - A breakthrough in treating blind patients using bionic eye technology is reported at Moorfields Eye Hospital in London.
  - The UK government announces that university tuition fees will increase annually with the rate of inflation from 2026.
  - King Charles III visits survivors of the Manchester synagogue attack.
  - Pizza Hut announces the closure of 68 UK restaurants and 11 delivery sites with the loss of 1,210 jobs after the firm running them went into administration.
  - Maccabi Tel Aviv says it will not accept any ticket allocation from Aston Villa should a decision to ban its supporters from a forthcoming match be overturned.
- 21 October
  - Office for National Statistics data indicates government borrowing was £20.2bn in September, an increase of £1.6bn from September 2024, and the highest for the month since September 2020.
  - The Indonesian government announces that Lindsay Sandiford, sentenced to death in Bali for drug smuggling in 2012, will be returned to the UK.
  - Gavin Plumb, who is serving a life sentence for plotting to kidnap, rape and murder TV presenter Holly Willoughby, loses an appeal against his sentence.
  - The Met Office issues yellow severe weather warnings for southern England and parts of Wales, with heavy rain and strong winds expected on Wednesday 22 October and Thursday 23 October.
  - The Ministry of Defence announces that a small number of British planning officers are to be sent to Gaza to help monitor the ceasefire.
  - George Abaraonye, the president-elect of the Oxford Union loses a vote of no confidence after he was criticised for social media comments appearing to celebrate the death of Charlie Kirk.
  - The posthumous memoir of Virginia Giuffre, Nobody's Girl, is published. It details the abuse she was subjected to by Jeffrey Epstein and Ghislaine Maxwell, Prince Andrew (whom she accused of sexual abuse when she was 17), and other influential men. It was released amid renewed public and media attention about Epstein, prominently his friendship with Trump and also his client list, and led to renewed public and media attention about her allegations against Andrew and his own friendship with Epstein.
- 22 October
  - Inflation for September remained at 3.8% for the third consecutive month, with food price inflation dropping from 5.1% to 4.5%, its lowest rate for over a year.
  - Storm Benjamin is named by Météo France and is expected to bring wind and heavy rain to the UK on 23 October, though the greatest impact is forecast to be in France, Belgium and the Netherlands.
  - A migrant who was removed to France under the one in, one out plan has returned to the UK after crossing the English Channel on a small boat. Starmer subsequently announces his deportation back to France will be fast-tracked.
- 23 October
  - A former Parachute Regiment soldier identified only as Soldier F is found not guilty of murder and attempted murder in Derry on Bloody Sunday.
  - The water regulator Ofwat orders water companies in England and Wales to refund more than £260m to customers for poor performance.
  - In Vatican City, King Charles III publicly prays with Pope Leo XIV, becoming the first British monarch to pray with a pope since Henry VIII split from the Roman Catholic Church in 1534.
- 24 October
  - Caerphilly by-election: Plaid Cymru's Lindsay Whittle claims victory with 47% of the vote – a swing of 27% from Labour, which had held the seat in Westminster since the 1920s and in the Senedd since 1999.
  - Volodymyr Zelenskyy and other European leaders meet with Starmer in Westminster for talks on Ukraine. Zelenskyy also meets King Charles for the third time this year.
  - Yostin Mosquera is sentenced to life imprisonment, with a minimum term before deductions of 42 years, for the murders of Albert Alfonso and Paul Longworth.
  - Prince Andrew's banner bearing his coat of arms is observed to have been removed from St George's Chapel at Windsor Castle.
  - Sheffield Wednesday, one of the world's oldest surviving football clubs, is placed in administration.
  - Six men are sentenced to prison terms for their parts in a Russian-ordered arson attack on a London warehouse providing aid to Ukraine.
  - The Booker Prize Foundation announces the launch of a Children's Booker Prize for the best contemporary fiction for children aged 8 to 12, with the first prize to be awarded in 2027.
- 25 October – The Met Police makes a direct appeal to Hadush Kebatu to turn himself in, after the migrant sex offender was mistakenly released from HMP Chelmsford and is later seen on CCTV footage in East London.
- 26 October – Hadush Kebatu is arrested in Finsbury Park, London, following a large-scale manhunt. Justice Secretary David Lammy orders a full investigation into the erroneous release.
- 27 October
  - Prisons in England and Wales begin to perform extra checks following the accidental release of Hadush Kebatu.
  - Five members of a Romanian grooming gang are sentenced to terms of between eight and 24 years in prison after being found guilty of sexually abusing 10 women in properties in Dundee.
  - During a visit to Lichfield Cathedral in Staffordshire, the King is heckled by a protester asking him about Prince Andrew's relationship with convicted sex offender Jeffrey Epstein.
  - Fresh allegations emerge regarding Prince Andrew, that he invited sex offenders Jeffrey Epstein, Harvey Weinstein and Ghislaine Maxwell to a ball at Royal Lodge in 2006.
  - The Renters' Rights Bill becomes law.
  - The UK government signs a deal worth £8bn to supply 20 Typhoon fighter jets to Turkey.

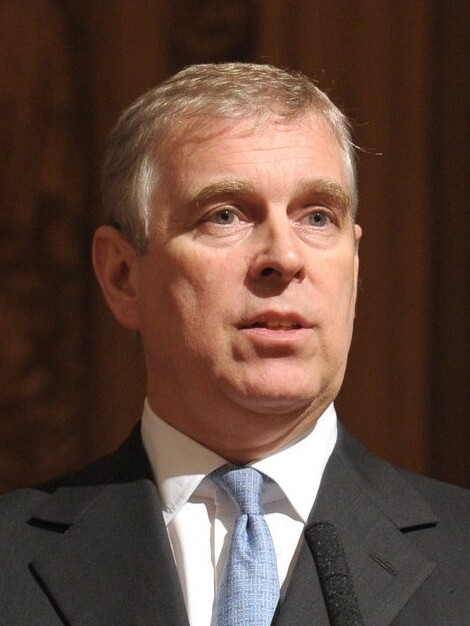
30 October: Following renewed public and media attention into his friendship with Jeffrey Epstein and the related allegations against him, Prince Andrew is to be stripped of his Prince title and will be known as Andrew Mountbatten-Windsor.

- 28 October
  - The Liberal Democrats announce that gender quotas for elections to party positions will now be applied according to sex at birth and not according to gender identify.
  - The Foreign Office announces that it stands "ready to support British nationals impacted by Hurricane Melissa" as the storm reaches Category 5 intensity in the Caribbean and makes landfall on Jamaica.
  - The UK government has earmarked two military sites in Inverness and East Sussex for use as accommodation for asylum seekers.
  - The UK government announces a review of cars and headlights on UK roads following complaints about drivers being dazzled by oncoming cars.
  - Hadush Kebatu is placed on a flight to Ethiopia and deported from the UK. He is given a £500 payment after threatening to disrupt his deportation.
- 30 October
  - Prince Andrew is to be stripped of his "prince" title and given "formal notice [...] to surrender the lease" on Royal Lodge.
  - The UK government charters flights to help several hundred British citizens leave Jamaica following Hurricane Melissa.
  - A 70-year-old man is killed and three other people injured in a helicopter crash in Doncaster.
  - The Parole Board confirms that double child killer Colin Pitchfork has been refused parole following an earlier hearing.
- 31 October
  - Prince Andrew is formally stripped of his prince title and will henceforth be known as Andrew Mountbatten-Windsor. His name is also removed from the Roll of the Peerage, but he is still eighth in the line of succession and remains a Counsellor of State.
  - A court martial sentences Warrant Officer Michael Webber to six months in prison over the sexual assault of a 19-year-old soldier who later took her own life.
  - The adult website Pornhub says that UK visitors have decreased by 77% since age verification checks were introduced in July under the Online Safety Act.

=== November ===
- 1 November
  - Eleven people are injured, two critically, in a mass stabbing aboard a train in Cambridgeshire. Two people are arrested following the incident.
  - A flight carrying UK citizens rescued from Jamaica following Hurricane Melissa arrives at Gatwick Airport.
- 2 November
  - A 32-year-old man is now the only suspect in the Cambridgeshire train stabbing after a second man, who was mistakenly reported as a suspect, is released.
  - John Healey, the Secretary of State for Defence, tells Sunday with Laura Kuenssberg that the UK government is "working to remove" Andrew Mountbatten Windsor's honorary title of Vice Admiral in the Royal Navy as per the King's wishes.
  - A £9bn government scheme is announced to modernise defence housing.
- 3 November
  - Cambridgeshire train stabbing: A 32-year-old man is charged with 10 counts of attempted murder.
  - A train from Glasgow to London is derailed at Shap, Cumbria, after colliding with a landslide that had obstructed the track.
- 4 November
  - In a pre-budget speech from Downing Street, Chancellor Rachel Reeves says she will make "necessary choices" in the forthcoming budget after the "world has thrown more challenges our way".
  - Sir Alan Bates is reported to have agreed a seven-figure compensation deal with the Post Office.
  - Footballer David Beckham is knighted by King Charles III in a ceremony at Windsor Castle.
  - The West Coast Main Line reopens following the previous day's train derailment in Cumbria.
  - A BBC investigation reports that a Kurdish crime gang is enabling illegal migrants to obtain work in high street mini-marts.
  - Tommy Robinson is found not guilty of the terrorism offence he was charged with after refusing to give his phone PIN to police when they stopped him at the Channel Tunnel terminal in Folkestone on his way to Spain. The judge says he was not sure that the stop was lawful and "I cannot put out of my mind that it was actually what you stood for and your political beliefs that acted for the principle reason for this stop" concluding "I cannot convict you".
- 5 November
  - A migrant who returned to the UK after being deported to France is once again deported from the UK.
  - The Advertising Standards Authority bans a number of adverts for LED face masks over unsubstantiated claims they can improve conditions such as acne and rosacea.
  - Police are hunting for a further two people mistakenly released from Wandsworth Prison.
  - West Yorkshire Police confirm three inmates at HMP Wakefield have been arrested on suspicion of murder after child killer Kyle Bevan is found dead in his cell.
- 6 November
  - A record number of referrals to the Prevent anti-terror programme is reported. New data shows a total of 8,778 referrals were made in the year to March 2025, up 27% from 6,922 the previous year.
  - The Bank of England holds its baseline interest rate unchanged at 4%.
  - NHS boss Sir James Mackey warns of a "long, drawn-out flu season" and says there is "no doubt this winter will be one of the toughest our staff have ever faced."
  - The King officially strips Andrew Mountbatten Windsor of his prince title.
  - Billy Smith, one of two prisoners at large after mistakenly being released from Wandsworth Prison, turns himself in.
  - A protest involving several hundred people takes place in Birmingham to coincide with Aston Villa's match against Maccabi Tel Aviv.
  - The UK has recorded the warmest Bonfire Night on record, with night time temperatures of 14 °C in a number of places.
- 7 November
  - Brahim Kaddour-Cherif, who was mistakenly released from Wandsworth Prison, is recaptured by police.
  - Julia Wandelt, who claimed to be Madeleine McCann, is found guilty of harassing the McCann family, but cleared of stalking. She is sentenced to six months in prison, which she has already served on remand.
  - Former city worker Howard Phillips, who attempted to pass information about former Defence Secretary Grant Shapps to Russia, is sentenced to seven years in prison.
  - ITV announces that it is in "preliminary" discussions to sell its media and entertainment division to Sky for £1.6bn.
  - Former footballer Joey Barton is found guilty of six counts of sending "grossly offensive" social media posts aimed at broadcaster Jeremy Vine and television pundits Lucy Ward and Eni Aluko. He will be sentenced on 8 December.
  - Four Labour MPs; Chris Hinchliff, Neil Duncan-Jordan, Brian Leishman, and Rachael Maskell all have the whip restored after being suspended for voting against the government's Welfare Reform Bill in July.
- 8 November
  - The BBC reports that in England and Wales, 262 prisoners were mistakenly released in the year up to March 2025, compared to 147 in the previous year and that two wrongly set free in June 2025 and two in the previous year are still at large.
  - Home Office data shows that 1,269 migrants crossed the English Channel in the previous two days after two weeks of bad weather during which there were no crossings.
- 9 November
  - Tim Davie resigns as Director-General of the BBC and Deborah Turness resigns as its Head of News following criticism after the publication of an internal report that says a Panorama documentary misled viewers by editing together two parts of a speech by US President Donald Trump to make it look like he had encouraged the 2021 Capitol riot.
  - HMRC is to review its decision to strip 23,000 families of child benefit payments after using travel data to determine they had permanently left the country.
  - Sir Richard Knighton, the Chief of the Defence Staff, says the UK is providing military support to Belgium following a series of suspected incursions by Russian drones into its airspace.
  - Another migrant returns to the UK after being sent to France from the UK under the government's one in, one out scheme. As of the week previous to this, the UK had returned 94 migrants to France and France has, in turn, sent 57 people to the UK under the agreement so far.
  - According to BBC News, 349 migrants cross the English Channel from France bringing the total so far this year to 39,075.
- 10 November
  - Lawyers acting for US President Donald Trump have given the BBC a deadline of 14 November to make a "full and fair retraction" of the Panorama documentary in which two separate parts of a speech were edited together or face a $1bn (£760m) lawsuit.
  - David Szalay wins the 2025 Booker Prize for his novel, Flesh.
- 11 November
  - Office for National Statistics data indicates that UK unemployment rose to 5% in the three months to September 2025, the highest rate since February 2021.
  - Former NHS manager Paul Lipscombe, who sexually assaulted and raped under age girls he groomed on Snapchat, is sentenced to 28 years in prison.
  - Following her conviction on 29 September, Zhimin Qian is sentenced to 11 years and eight months in prison.
  - Epping Forest District Council loses a High Court challenge to have asylum seekers removed from the Bell Hotel.
  - A yellow weather alert for heavy rain and floods is in place for parts of the UK for 11 and 12 November.
  - Data published by the Ministry of Justice indicates 91 prisoners were released by mistake between April and October.
  - Muriel McKay, who was kidnapped for ransom in 1969, is officially declared dead at a High Court hearing.
- 12 November
  - Starmer tells Prime Minister's Questions he has "never authorised" attacks on his cabinet ministers after his political allies within Labour told a number of media outlets he could face a leadership challenge from a prominent member of his cabinet.
  - A Prisons and Probation Ombudsman report has concluded that Neville Husband, a prison guard who worked at Medomsley Detention Centre in County Durham and who died in 2010, may be "possibly the most prolific sex offender in British history". Husband was convicted of offences against five teenage boys in 2003, but there are another 338 complaints against him.
  - Transport Secretary Heidi Alexander announces changes to the system for booking driving tests that prevents third parties from block-booking them with the use of bots.
- 13 November
  - Office for National Statistics data indicates that UK economic growth slowed to 0.1% between July and September, partially as a result of the impact caused to car production by the cyber attack against Jaguar Land Rover.
  - A review by Surrey County Council into the murder of Sara Sharif hears that social workers tried to visit her the day before her murder in August 2023, but went to the wrong address.
  - The UK's first nuclear power station to be constructed with small modular reactors is to be built at Wylfa on the isle of Anglesey, creating 3,000 jobs.
  - Figures show the waiting list for NHS England was at 7.39 million in September, down from the August total of 7.41 million, and represents the first fall after three consecutive months of increases.
  - First Minister of Scotland John Swinney confirms plans for the Scottish Government to issue its first bonds in 2026–27 after Scotland is given the same rating as the UK by credit rating agencies.
  - The Home Office announces that the 41 police and crime commissioners in England and Wales will be scrapped from 2028, with their responsibilities moving to either directly elected mayors or council leaders.
  - Newly released emails from the Jeffrey Epstein estate show that Virginia Giuffre was on the late sex offenders' plane with Andrew Mountbatten-Windsor and had her photo taken with him. This appears to contradict the former prince's assertion that he never met Ms Giuffre and his suggestion that the image of him with his arm around her may have been doctored.
  - The BBC apologises to Trump over the Panorama documentary, but refuses to pay him any compensation.
- 14 November
  - According to government sources, Chancellor Rachel Reeves decides against raising income tax at the forthcoming budget after receiving better than expected economic forecasts.
  - Storm Claudia: An amber weather warning is in place for "heavy and persistent" rain.
  - BBC Radio 2 presenter Sara Cox completes her five-day, 135-mile Great Northern Marathon Challenge, raising more than £9.5m for Children in Need.
  - Analytics firm Nielsen says that Flora And Fern: Kindness Along The Way, a forthcoming children's book by Sarah Ferguson, has been withdrawn from publication.
- 15 November
  - A major incident is declared in Monmouth due to severe and widespread flooding caused by Storm Claudia.
  - Home secretary Shabana Mahmood announces plans to change the asylum system, including reducing the length of refugee status, extending the required period before applying for long-term residency, and ending automatic state benefits for asylum seekers.
- 18 November
  - MI5 issues an alert to MPs, peers and parliamentary staff after security services identified two LinkedIn profiles, which are allegedly being used on behalf of the Chinese Ministry of State Security.
  - The Met Office issues weather alerts for ice and snow for Scotland and northern England for the following day.
  - Office for National Statistics data indicates net migration to the UK in 2024 was 20% lower than previously thought.
- 19 November
  - Inflation for the 12 months to October dropped by 0.2% to 3.6%, the lowest for four months, although food price inflation rose to 4.9%, up from 4.5% in September.
  - Defence Secretary John Healey tells the House of Commons that the Russian research vessel Yantar has been seen stationed outside UK territorial waters where it is monitoring UK military activity, and that lasers on the vessel have been directed at RAF aircraft.
  - Following a trial at the Old Bailey, convicted sex offender and former police officer David Carrick is found guilty of sexually abusing a 12-year-old girl and a partner.
  - Snowfall occurs in some parts of the UK, leading to travel delays and disruption.
  - Two pro-Palestine activists convicted of harassing MP Alex Davies-Jones in June have their convictions overturned by the Court of Appeal.
- 20 November
  - COVID-19 in the UK: The second report to be released by the COVID-19 Inquiry summarises the UK's response to the pandemic as "too little, too late" and suggests that delaying the decision to go into lockdown by a week cost 23,000 lives in England. It also concludes lockdown may have been unnecessary if steps such as social distancing and the isolation of those with symptoms along with members of their household had been brought in earlier than mid-March 2020.
  - Home Secretary Shabana Mahmood announces plans to extend the period migrants arriving legally into the UK must wait before being able to apply to remain indefinitely from five to 20 years; the new rules will affect 2.6 million people who have arrived in the UK since 2021.
  - David Carrick receives an additional life sentence following his convictions the previous day.
  - Eurotunnel halts its UK projects, claiming "unsustainable" levels of taxation has made any future investments "non-viable".
- 21 November
  - Government borrowing for October was at £17.4bn, official figures have shown, higher than the £15bn forecast by experts.
  - The UK experiences its coldest night of the autumn so far, and the coldest overnight November temperature since 2010, with a low of -12.7 °C at Tomintoul in Moray.
  - Ofgem announces a 0.2% rise in the energy price cap from the beginning of January, affecting households on variable tariffs.
  - Former cabinet minister Michael Gove apologises on behalf of the UK government and Conservative Party for "mistakes made" during the COVID-19 pandemic.
  - At the Old Bailey, Nathan Gill, former UKIP and later Reform UK leader in Wales, is sentenced to 10 and a half years in prison for accepting Russian bribes while in the European Parliament during 2018 and 2019.
  - Shumeet Banerji resigns from the BBC Board over what he describes as "governance issues" at the top of the organisation.
- 22 November
  - Daily Mail and General Trust have agreed to buy The Daily Telegraph and The Sunday Telegraph for £500m.
  - King's College London announces details of a new UK clinical trial to assess the risks and benefits of puberty-blocking drugs in children who question their gender.
  - The UK government announces that regulated train fares in England will be frozen in 2026 for the first time in 30 years.
- 23 November
  - The Ministry of Defence reports that two Russian ships were intercepted by the Royal Navy in the English Channel.
  - Former Prime Minister David Cameron reveals he has been treated for prostate cancer.
- 24 November – The Home Office announces a new national day "to honour and remember" the victims of terrorism in the UK, starting on 21 August 2026.
- 25 November
  - The UK government announces an increase in the minimum wage of 50p to £12.71 for those aged over 21 and an 85p rise to £10.85 for those aged 18–20 from April 2026.
  - Justice Secretary David Lammy announces plans to restrict trials by jury to the most serious offences.
  - Graham Linehan is cleared of harassing a transgender activist, but convicted of damaging their phone.
- 26 November
  - Paul Doyle pleads guilty to causing the Liverpool parade incident, in which 130 people were injured by a car driving through the crowd.
  - The Chancellor of the Exchequer, Rachel Reeves delivers the November 2025 United Kingdom budget.
  - Farmers stage a budget day protest in central London at which several arrests are made.
  - The use of Ajax armoured vehicles is suspended by the British Armed Forces after a number of soldiers became ill as a result of noise and vibration during a military exercise.
  - Grace Richardson is crowned as the first openly gay Miss England.
- 27 November
  - JPMorgan announces plans for a major new headquarters building in London's Canary Wharf. The tower project, located in the Riverside area, will cost more than £3 billion and contain over 3 million sq ft of space.
  - The UK government waters down planned changes to employee rights: instead of protection from unfair dismissal beginning on the first day of employment (a Labour manifesto pledge), protection will begin after six months.
  - Office for National Statistics data indicates net migration in the 12 months up to June 2025 was down by two-thirds when compared to the same period for 2023–24, with a figure of 204,000 compared to 649,000 for the previous year, with the reduction due mostly to fewer people arriving for work and study.
  - A seventh arrest is made in connection with the Manchester synagogue attack.
- 28 November
  - A panel of medical experts recommends against a UK prostate cancer screening programme for all men, but instead suggests it should focus on those with specific genetic mutations that cause aggressive tumours.
  - France agrees to start intercepting small boats in the English Channel following pressure from the UK.
  - Chancellor Rachel Reeves announces that people on a state pension with no other income will not be required to pay tax.
  - Talks between the UK and EU to allow UK firms to play a greater role in the EU's £150bn defence scheme break down over financial disagreements.
  - The Civil Aviation Authority warns of disruption to flights, as well as some cancellations, after Airbus announces that its aeroplanes need a software update.
  - The Home Office delays plans to house asylum seekers in two former military bases in East Sussex and the Scottish Highlands.
- 29 November – The UK government announces that asylum seekers will be banned from using taxis, paid by the Home Office, to get to and from medical appointments from February 2026.
- 30 November
  - Oxford University Press names rage bait as its word or phrase of the year.
  - Gaelic and Scots are both now recognised as Official Languages of the United Kingdom.

=== December ===
- 1 December
  - Richard Hughes resigns as chair of the Office for Budget Responsibility as an inquiry is launched into how details of the November 2025 United Kingdom budget were published 40 minutes before Chancellor Rachel Reeves delivered the statement to Parliament.
  - The UK and US agree a deal to keep tariffs on pharmaceuticals imported from the UK to the US at 0%.
  - Severe weather warnings are in place for the UK for heavy rain, with an amber alert in place for south Wales and yellow alerts in place for south west England.
  - Ofcom fines Virgin Media £23.8m for leaving thousands of customers without access to lifesaving telecare alarms during the change from analogue to digital telephone lines.
- 2 December
  - Justice Secretary David Lammy announces that jury trials in England and Wales for crimes with a likely sentence of less than three years will be scrapped, to reduce the backlog of cases in the court system.
  - An Independent Office for Police Conduct report into the Hillsborough disaster finds that 12 senior police officers would have faced gross misconduct proceedings over their roles in the disaster if they had still been employed in the police service.
  - Girlguiding announces that transgender girls will be banned from joining the Girl Guide groups in the UK.
  - Justice Secretary Lammy announces that 12 prisoners have been accidentally released in the past three weeks, with two still at large.
- 3 December
  - The Women’s Institute announces that it will no longer offer membership to transgender women.
  - A UK government plan is announced to allow parents to buy formula milk using supermarket loyalty points and vouchers.
  - An independent review into the 2019 death of Harry Dunn finds that the Foreign Office did not treat the case as a crisis and withheld information from his family.
  - A 3.4-magnitude earthquake is felt across much of north-west England, with its epicentre believed to be Silverdale, Lancashire.
- 4 December – The UK government unveils its child poverty strategy, which includes pledges to stop children growing up in bed and breakfast accommodation and making childcare more accessible to families on Universal Credit.
- 5 December – A doctor is charged with sexually assaulting 38 patients while working at major hospitals in the West Midlands.
- 6 December
  - The Labour Party announces that transgender women will not be allowed to attend main Labour Women's Conference events.
  - The Tower of London is partially closed after a display case containing Crown Jewels is defaced by protesters throwing apple crumble and custard at it. Four people are arrested.
  - The Met Office issues a yellow weather warning for heavy rain for south west England and south Wales, which is in force from 6pm on Monday 8 December to 6pm on Tuesday 9 December.
- 7 December
  - Twenty-one people are treated for injuries, including five in hospital, following a suitcase robbery during which a substance was sprayed in a car park at Heathrow Airport. A man is arrested, while police are searching for others involved in the incident.
  - The UK government announces a £175m scheme to tackle youth unemployment by expanding apprenticeships, which it expects to benefit around 50,000 people. Details of the plans are outlined the following day.
  - The UK's Lando Norris wins his first Formula 1 drivers' championship after securing third place in the season-ending Abu Dhabi Grand Prix.
- Logo for Great British Railways
  8 December
  - Ukrainian president Volodymyr Zelenskyy attends a summit in London with Keir Starmer, French President Emmanuel Macron and German Chancellor Friedrich Merz to discuss the latest version of a peace plan, drafted between Ukrainian and US officials.
  - The UK Health Security Agency confirms that a new strain of the mpox virus has been found in a person in England.
  - Former Premier League footballer Joey Barton is sentenced to six months in prison, suspended for 18 months, for sending six "grossly offensive" social media posts. He is ordered to complete rehabilitation work and 200 hours of unpaid community service, as well as paying more than £23,000 in legal costs.
  - Peggie v NHS Fife: a female nurse who objected to sharing a changing room with a doctor who was a transgender woman wins her claim for harassment but not for discrimination and victimisation.
  - A further two people are arrested following a robbery at Heathrow Airport during which a substance was sprayed.
  - The official branding, liveries, and logo for Great British Railways are unveiled.
- 9 December
  - Storm Bram brings heavy rain and strong winds to large parts of the UK, leaving thousands without power and causing widespread travel disruption. More than 70 flood warnings are in place across England, Wales and Scotland.
  - The Ministry of Defence confirms the death of a member of the UK Armed Forces occurred in Ukraine while they were watching the testing of a new military capability. He is subsequently named as Lance Corporal George Hooley.
  - A final report into Operation Kenova, the £40m investigation into the Troubles-era British Army agent known as Stakeknife concludes that MI5 had a larger role in his handling than previously disclosed.
  - Home Secretary Shabana Mahmood announces that former Children's Commissioner Baroness Anne Longfield will lead the inquiry into grooming gangs.
  - COVID-19 in the UK: Publication of a report into the £10.9bn government money lost to fraud and error during the pandemic, much of which it describes as "beyond recovery".
  - Nnena Kalu is announced as the winner of the 2025 Turner Prize.
- 10 December
  - Leon Restaurants announces the closure of 20 of its outlets in a major restructuring process.
  - Paignton Zoo and Newquay Zoo are both sold to Dutch leisure company Libéma, with plans to invest £10 million over the next two years.
- 11 December
  - As cases continue to rise rapidly, driven by a new mutated version of the flu virus, NHS National Medical Director Meghana Pandit warns that "this unprecedented wave of super flu is leaving the NHS facing a worst-case scenario for this time of year."
  - The UK government announces £3bn of funding to create a further 50,000 places for children with special educational needs and disabilities in mainstream schools in England.
  - The Royal Navy says it has shadowed the Russian submarine Krasnodar though the English Channel to "safeguard" UK interests.
- 12 December
  - Office for National Statistics data indicates the UK economy shrank by 0.1% in October, as well as in the three months leading up to October; forecasters had expected it to grow by 0.1%.
  - In a recorded broadcast for Channel 4's Stand Up to Cancer, the King says that early diagnosis and "effective intervention" means his cancer treatment can be reduced in the new year.
  - Andrew Mountbatten-Windsor and Richard Branson appear in newly-released photos from the estate of Jeffrey Epstein.
  - Following a trial at Inner London Crown Court, Robert Rhodes is convicted of the murder of his wife, Dawn Rhodes, eight years after he was cleared in an earlier trial. Rhodes is convicted under the double jeopardy law after new evidence emerged that he had coerced his child into helping to make the murder look like an act of self-defence.
- 13 December
  - The first migrants are recorded as having crossed the channel since 14 November, the longest period without such crossings since 2018. A total of 737 are recorded on this date.
  - The Metropolitan Police says it will "take no further action" over reports Andrew Mountbatten-Windsor asked his police protection officer for information on Virginia Giuffre.
  - The UK government announces that every police force in England and Wales will have a specialist rape and sexual offences investigation team by 2029.
- 14 December
  - The King has sent a red post box to the British Antarctic Survey station at Rothera.
- 15 December
  - Giving her first public speech since taking over as director of MI6, Blaise Metreweli warns the UK faces an "interlocking web of security challenges" from countries such as Russia and China.
  - A two-day hearing for Paul Doyle, who is charged with injuring 130 people after driving through a crowd, begins at Liverpool Crown Court.
  - A BBC Panorama investigation alleges that courier firm Evri has compromised on delivery standards and worker pay. Undercover footage shows packages being misplaced and poorly handled, while some employees report being paid below the minimum wage.
  - Sir Cliff Richard reveals that he has been treated for prostate cancer, and that the disease is in remission.
- 16 December
  - A BBC spokesperson says the corporation will defend a $5bn (£3.7bn) lawsuit filed against it by US President Donald Trump over an edit of his 6 January 2021 speech in a Panorama documentary.
  - On the second day of his court hearing, Paul Doyle is sentenced to 21 years and six months in prison. Judge Andrew Menary KC says Doyle "drove over limbs and crushed prams" causing "devastation" as he injured 130 people.
  - The UK government considers a green paper of new ways to fund the BBC, such as replacing the television licence with either advertising or a subscription model.
  - David Norris, one of two people convicted for the 1993 murder of Stephen Lawrence, is refused his application for parole.
  - BBC News reports that the UK will rejoin the Erasmus Scheme which provides funding for students to study, train or volunteer in the European Union.
  - Office for National Statistics data indicates that UK unemployment rose to 5.1% in the three months to October 2025, the highest rate since January 2021. The figure for 18 to 24-year-olds increased by 85,000, the biggest rise since November 2022.
- 17 December
  - Doctors across England begin a five-day strike over pay and training. The Prime Minister calls the action "dangerous and utterly irresponsible" amid the surge in flu cases. The leader of the opposition says Starmer didn't "have the baubles" to ban the strikes.
  - The Office for National Statistics reports that inflation fell from 3.6% to 3.2% in November, driven by lower food, alcohol, and clothing prices.
  - James Spencer-Churchill, 12th Duke of Marlborough, is charged with three counts of strangulation against the same person over an 18-month period.
- 18 December
  - The Bank of England cuts the UK interest rate by 0.25% to 3.75%, the lowest rate it has been for almost three years.
  - The UK government announces plans to ban "nudification" apps as part of plans to tackle misogyny online.
  - Rory McIlroy is named as the 2025 BBC Sports Personality of the Year.
  - Following a trial at the Old Bailey, Covid denier Paul Martin, who urged people to stage an armed revolt in a series of social media during the pandemic, is sentenced to three years and three months in custody.
  - The Manchester Civil Court of Justice rules that 16 children injured in the Manchester Arena bombing will receive a share of £20m in compensation.
- 19 December
  - Trade Minister Chris Bryant confirms a police investigation is ongoing following a cyber attack against the UK government in October.
  - Richard Moth is appointed as Archbishop of Westminster by the Vatican, making him the head of the Roman Catholic Church in England and Wales.
  - The UK government announces sanctions against militia groups who are targeting civilians in Syria.
  - Following concerns about staffing levels in UK prisons, it is announced that foreign nationals working as prison officers in the UK have been given a temporary exemption from new visa rules.
  - The BBC announces an overhaul of its editorial committee following criticism of the way it handled concerns about the editing of its Panorama documentary concerning a speech Donald Trump made prior to the January 6 riots.
  - "XMAS" by Kylie Minogue is the 2025 UK Christmas number one single, after beating off competition from Wham!'s "Last Christmas", which had won in the previous two years.
  - David Walliams rejects allegations of inappropriate behaviour after he is dropped by his publisher, HarperCollins UK.
- 20 December
  - Prince William takes his son, Prince George, to visit The Passage, the homeless charity he visited himself as a boy with his mother, Diana, Princess of Wales.
  - Prince William becomes patron of the Special Air Service Regiment Association.
- 21 December
  - Records show that more than 800 migrants crossed the English Channel on 20 December, a record for December.
  - The UK government announces that trail hunting will be banned in England and Wales as part of a new animal welfare strategy to be published the following day.
  - Sixes, a chain of cricket-themed bars linked to cricketer Ben Stokes, goes into administration.
- 22 December
  - A major incident is declared on the Llangollen Canal at Whitchurch, Shropshire, after a stretch of waterway collapses, described as an "embankment failure".
  - The UK government unveils its animal welfare improvements, which also include ending farrowing crates for pigs and puppy farming, as well as a ban on the use of hen cages.
- 23 December
  - The Met Office reports that 2025 is likely to have been the UK's hottest year since records began in the late 1800s.
  - Swedish activist Greta Thunberg is arrested in central London under the Terrorism Act during a demonstration in support of Palestine Action hunger strikers.
  - The latest batch of Epstein files released by the US Justice Department show an "A" from Balmoral communicating with Ghislaine Maxwell in 2001 and seeking "new inappropriate friends". The BBC reports that the sender appears to have been the Duke of York (now known as Andrew Mountbatten-Windsor), but says that there is no suggestion of any wrongdoing and that Mountbatten-Windsor has repeatedly denied any wrongdoing.
  - Russell Brand is charged with two further offences including one count of rape.
  - This year's Royal Christmas Message will come from Westminster Abbey, Buckingham Palace confirms.
  - It is reported that police leaders are to recommend scrapping the logging of non-crime hate incidents.
- 24 December – The UK's Civil Aviation Authority says Christmas Eve 2025 will see the largest number of air passengers travelling to and from UK airports is forecast to be the most since records began in 1972.
- 25 December – In his Christmas message, the King urges communities to come together in an increasingly divided world.
- 26 December
  - Figures produced up to 3pm indicate Boxing Day sales in physical stores have fallen by 1.5% on 2024, while online sales are down by 0.6%.
  - The Jukebox Man, a horse owned by football manager Harry Redknapp, wins the 2025 King George VI Chase.
- 27 December
  - BBC News reports that the UK government is to offer adults under the age of 25 a paid military gap year as a way of boosting military recruitment.
  - HM Treasury is to insure the Bayeux Tapestry for £800m against loss or damage while it is on loan to the British Museum in 2026.
  - British-Egyptian writer and pro-democracy activist Alaa Abdel Fattah arrives in the UK after a travel ban imposed by the Egyptian authorities is lifted.
- 28 December
  - The Conservative Party calls for Alaa Abdel Fattah to be deported from the UK and for his citizenship to be revoked after the emergence of social media posts in which he called for Zionists to be killed.
  - The UK government announces plans to limit visas from the Democratic Republic of the Congo after it failed to agree to measures allowing the return of illegal migrants and foreign national offenders.
- 29 December
  - Analysis by the RAC motoring group indicates that compensation payments by UK councils for pothole damage have increased by 90% between 2021 and 2024.
  - Data published by British Geological Survey indicates there have been more than 300 earthquakes in the UK during 2025.
  - Fattah apologises over resurfaced tweets as the UK government comes under pressure to revoke his UK citizenship.
  - 2026 New Year Honours: Those recognised in the Honours include Olympic ice dancers Jayne Torvill and Christopher Dean, who receive a Damehood and Knighthood respectively, England women's football team manager Sarina Wiegman, who is made an honorary dame, England rugby player Ellie Kildunne, who receives an MBE, Welsh rugby player Jonathan Davies, who becomes a CBE, and actor Idris Elba, who is Knighted.
- 30 December
  - Eurostar trains from London St Pancras are cancelled for several hours following a power outage in the Channel Tunnel.
  - The Cabinet Office blames an "administrative error" for briefly releasing files concerning overseas trips made by Andrew Mountbatten Windsor under the 20-year privacy rule. The files, relating to 2004 and 2005, were briefly made available to journalists.
  - Foreign Secretary Yvette Cooper launches a review into what she describes as "serious information failures" in the case of British-Egyptian activist Alaa Abdel Fattah.
  - Octopus Energy announces plans to sell off its subsidiary, Kraken Technologies, as a standalone company in a deal worth £6.4bn.
- 31 December
  - UK company Space Forge reports a milestone in space-based manufacturing, after successfully demonstrating a 1,000 °C furnace aboard an orbital micro-factory. The system is designed to produce semiconductor materials in microgravity, which the company claims could be up to 4,000 times purer than those manufactured on Earth.
  - Waitrose recalls 750ml bottles of No1 Royal Deeside Mineral Water, and its sparkling variety, amid concerns some bottles may contain glass.
  - National Rail warns of disruption to train journeys throughout New Year's Eve following the theft of signalling cables between Doncaster and Sheffield.

== Births ==
- 22 January – Athena Elizabeth Rose Mapelli Mozzi, daughter of Princess Beatrice of York and Edoardo Mapelli Mozzi

== See also ==
- Politics of the United Kingdom
- 2020s in United Kingdom political history
