= Just Stop Oil Sunflowers protest =

2022 London protest

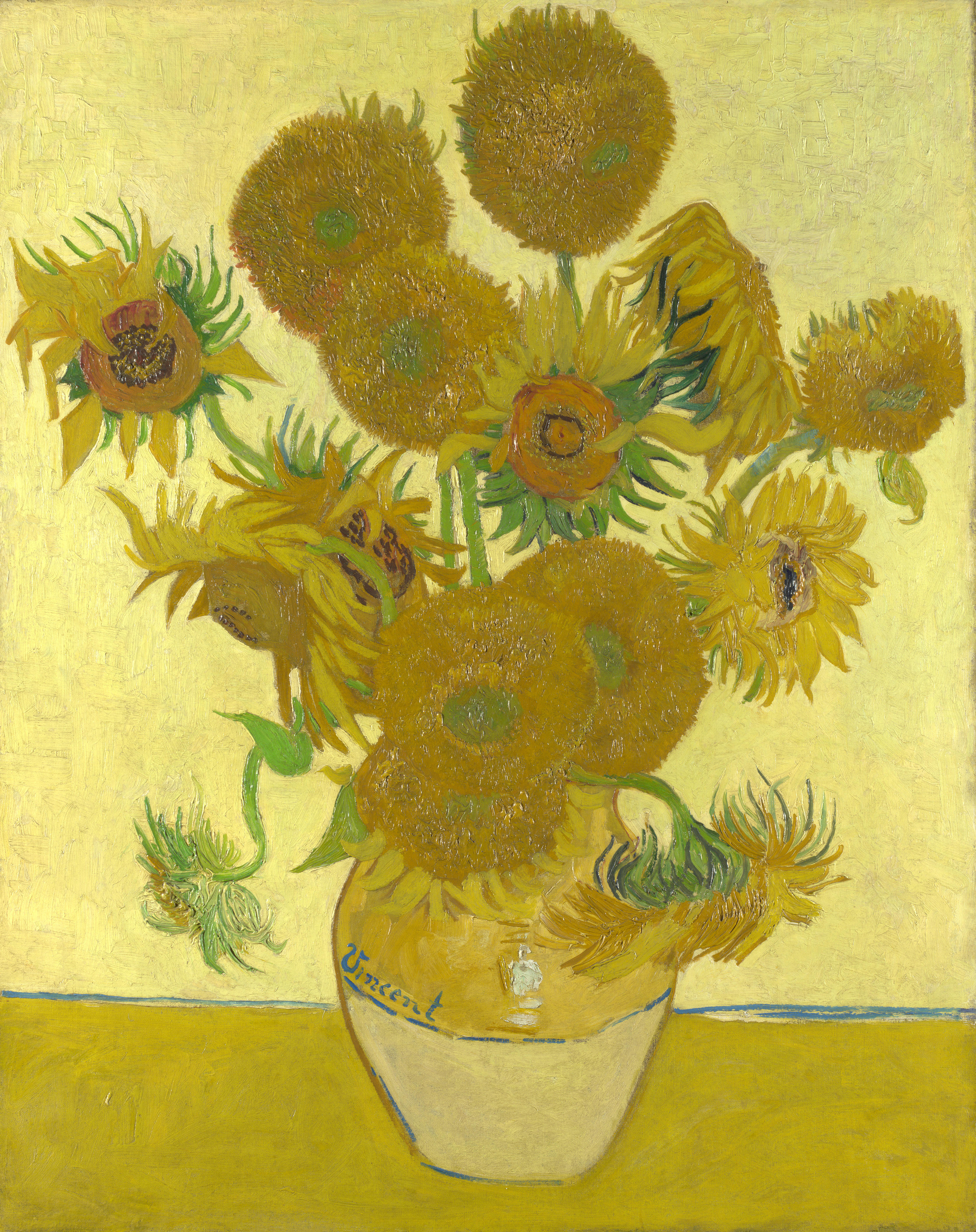
- The 1888 version of Sunflowers by Vincent van Gogh involved in the protest
- Date: 14 October 2022
- Location: National Gallery, Trafalgar Square, London, England, United Kingdom; 51°30′32″N 0°07′40″W
- Type: Anti-oil industry protest, vandalism of art
- Organised by: Just Stop Oil
- Property damage: c. £10,000
- Convicted: Phoebe Plummer; Anna Holland
- Trial: July 2024
- Convictions: Criminal damage
- Sentence: 2 years' imprisonment (Plummer); 20 months' imprisonment (Holland)
R v Plummer and Holland
- Court: Southwark Crown Court
- Decided: 27 September 2024
- Transcript: https://www.judiciary.uk/wp-content/uploads/2024/09/HOLLAND.SENTREMS.pdf
Case history
- Appealed to: Court of Appeal
- Subsequent action: Appeals dismissed
Court membership
- Judge sitting: Christopher Hehir

The Just Stop Oil Sunflowers protest refers to an incident that occurred on 14 October 2022 at the National Gallery in London, United Kingdom. Two Just Stop Oil activists, Phoebe Plummer and Anna Holland, each threw the contents of a tin of Heinz tomato soup at an 1888 Sunflowers painting by Vincent van Gogh before gluing themselves to the wall it hung on and asking onlookers whether they were more concerned by the protest or by the effects of climate change on the planet. The activists, who were motivated by a decrease in media coverage of the organisation's activism, had selected the painting as a target due to its vulnerability; as a result of the act, approximately £10,000 worth of damage was caused to the painting's frame. A video recording of the protest was published on social media, attracting worldwide censure. While Plummer and Holland were subjected to homophobic abuse following the protest, it inspired several subsequent protests involving throwing food products at paintings. Convicted of criminal damage in July 2024, Plummer and Holland received prison sentences of 2 years and 20 months, respectively.

== Background and preparation ==
Just Stop Oil is a UK environmental activist group that was founded in February 2022 to oppose new UK government licences for fossil fuel exploration and production. The group began many protests including a July 2022 action where activists glued themselves to John Constable's oil painting The Hay Wain at the National Gallery in London.

In response to reduced media coverage, two members of the group, Phoebe Plummer and Anna Holland, sought a symbolic act to regain attention. After considering other targets, they chose Vincent van Gogh's oil painting Sunflowers for its visibility. The act was carefully planned, including reconnaissance of the gallery, rehearsals, and preparing speeches.

== Protest and bail ==
The pair entered the gallery at around 11 am the next day and entered room 43 with two cans of Heinz Cream of Tomato soup, superglue, and a loaf of bread. After waiting for more than ten minutes for a group of schoolchildren to move out of the way, the pair removed their jackets to reveal white shirts with Just Stop Oil slogans, threw their soup at the painting, glued themselves to the wall, and asked onlookers whether art was worth more than life, food, and justice. A nervous Plummer deviated from their (Note: Both Holland and Plummer identify as non-binary and use singular they pronouns.) plan and was still talking about dying mangroves by the time the guards had cleared the gallery, meaning Holland did not have time to deliver their speech. The acid in the soup eroded some of the frame's patina and left permanent pale streaks, causing £10,000 damage. A supporter filmed the act for publicity purposes.

The protest caused worldwide outrage, though some complainants were assuaged by the fact that the painting was behind glass and was itself unharmed. The pair received significant homophobic abuse from social media and right-wing newspapers following the incident, though their actions inspired several subsequent climate activists to throw food at paintings around the world, including mashed potato in Germany at a Claude Monet painting and maple syrup in Canada at an Emily Carr painting. Plummer became one of the organisation's most recognised faces, though Holland stepped back from frontline activism after seeing the effect their protests had had on their family.

The pair were arrested and charged with criminal damage and aggravated trespass and pleaded not guilty at Westminster Magistrates' Court on the grounds that they had caused no damage to the painting. They were released on bail on the condition that they did not enter galleries or museums, or possess paint or adhesive substances in a public place, following which they took the Tube to a safe house still wearing their prison uniforms. Surreptitious photos of them laughing during the journey were sent to a tabloid, which resulted in further outraged newspaper stories. In an interview with Damian Whitworth of The Times published in July 2024, Plummer stated that they had felt "empowered" by the soup throwing incident, as they felt they were "seizing back power from the systems that are hell-bent on destroying us and destroying everything we know and love".

== Trial and reactions ==
Plummer and Holland faced a jury trial for their actions in July 2024 at Southwark Crown Court, at which Plummer represented themself and Raj Chada represented Holland. They faced Judge Christopher Hehir, who earlier that month had sentenced five activists—known as the Whole Truth Five and including Roger Hallam—to multi-year jail terms for organising a rolling four-day blockade of the M25 motorway. Hehir dismissed several of Chada's defences and forbade Plummer and Holland from discussing climate change or trying to justify their actions, allowing them only to argue that they were not knowingly reckless at the time. He also repeatedly reminded the jury to disregard the defendants' reasoning and to not return a perverse verdict. The jury took just over two hours to return a guilty verdict, prompting Hehir to warn the pair to expect jail time.

In September 2024, more than 100 artists, curators and academics signed an open letter coordinated by Greenpeace and Liberate Tate imploring Hehir not to sentence Plummer and Holland to prison. On 27 September 2024, the day of sentencing, several hundred supporters of Plummer and Holland held a vigil outside the court.

In his sentencing remarks, Hehir strongly condemned the defendants' act, referring to it as "extreme, disproportionate and criminally idiotic". Besides the permanent damage caused to the painting's frame, aggravating factors found included the risk of damage the painting itself was exposed to. In Plummer's case, Hehir also cited their previous convictions, an offence of traffic obstruction committed while on bail, and their lack of remorse. Hehir imposed on Plummer consecutive sentences of 24 months' imprisonment (on the criminal damage count) and 3 months' imprisonment (on an unrelated charge of interfering with key national infrastructure), while issuing a criminal behaviour order. In Holland's case, one previous conviction of traffic obstruction was cited. Hehir meanwhile noted their acknowledgement of the "substantial adverse effect" their offending had had on their family, and that Holland had not reoffended since the Sunflowers protest. Holland was sentenced to 20 months' imprisonment.

Around an hour after sentencing, further activists performed an identical protest at the National Gallery; in response to both Sunflowers protests and attacks on its Hay Wain and Rokeby Venus paintings, the National Gallery instituted a ban on liquids except baby formula, breast milk, and prescription medicines from being brought in. Matthew Taylor of The Guardian wrote on 20 December that Holland, who was serving their sentence at HM Prison Send, would be one of 40 protesters to be in prison that Christmas, though a 41st protester was returned to jail the day after.

In response to the sentence, activists from Last Generation threw soup at the Embassy of the United Kingdom in Berlin, and similar protests took place outside other UK embassies in Amsterdam, Paris, and Rome. Writing in The Guardian, George Monbiot criticised Plummer and Holland's sentences and stated that Hehir had given suspended sentences to violent criminals, rapists, and paedophiles, and that Huw Edwards and racist protesters in the 2024 United Kingdom riots had also been given suspended sentences. Nadya Tolokonnikova opined in the same paper that "breaking and destroying" was "a valid and striking artistic and political statement" and stated that Van Gogh would have approved of the protest as nature was his muse. Celia Walden, who was less sympathetic, instructed the pair and the three activists who attacked Sunflowers that day to use their words and wrote that it was "unfortunate for them" that they had drawn Hehir due to his history of sentencing protesters. In a YouGov poll conducted the week after sentencing, 37 per cent of those polled said the sentences were "about right" and 36 per cent said they were "not harsh enough".

In January 2025, Plummer, Holland, Hallam, Gaie Delap, and twelve other Just Stop Oil protesters challenged the lengths of their sentences at the Court of Appeal. The sixteen named themselves the "Lord Walney 16" after Lord Walney, an independent advisor to the government on political violence and disruption, on the grounds that their sentences were influenced by a report he produced called Protecting our Democracy from Coercion. Their appeal was supported by Greenpeace, Friends of the Earth, and the great-granddaughter of Emmeline Pankhurst, though Lord Walney described the group as "silly" and instructed them to "accept some responsibility for [their] criminal behaviour". During the first day, activists dressed in iron muzzles and long black gowns held a silent vigil outside the court, while large numbers of activists holding a sit-down protest outside the Royal Courts of Justice caused The Strand to be closed. On 7 March 2025, Baroness Carr shortened the sentences of Delap and the Whole Truth Five but upheld those of Plummer and Holland, citing damage caused to heritage and cultural assets as aggravating factors.
