= Christopher Hehir =

British judge (born 1966)

- Born: Christopher Joseph Hehir; 15 November 1966 (age 59)
- Education: Merton College, Oxford
- Occupation: Judge
- Known for: Just Stop Oil M25 blockade case Just Stop Oil Sunflowers protest

Christopher Joseph Hehir (born 15 November 1966) is a British judge. Called to the bar in 1990, he later sat as a judge at Southwark Crown Court and a London Nightingale Court. In July 2024, he sentenced Roger Hallam to five years in prison and four other protesters to four years each for their parts in the Just Stop Oil M25 blockade case, prompting criticism from over 1,200 artists, athletes, and academics. He then sentenced Phoebe Plummer and Anna Holland to 24 and 20 months over their parts in the Just Stop Oil Sunflowers protest. He had received an open letter imploring him not to imprison them, and various writers compared their crimes to those committed by those he had previously given suspended sentences.

== Life and career ==
Christopher Joseph Hehir was born on 15 November 1966 and was educated at St Aloysius' College, Glasgow, Charters School, and Merton College, Oxford. He was called to the bar at Inner Temple in 1990 and practised from King's Bench Walk Chambers. He spent a period serving as a judge at Southwark Crown Court and then at Nightingale Court, a temporary court set up to clear a backlog of cases caused by the COVID-19 pandemic in the United Kingdom. In October 2014, he represented the Crown Prosecution Service against Moazzam Begg, though the prosecution offered no evidence at trial after discovering new evidence shortly beforehand.

In 2014, as a recorder, he gave a suspended sentence to two brothers who had assaulted two police officers and a bystander. He upheld Alison Chabloz's conviction for broadcasting "grossly offensive" anti-Semitic songs in February 2019 and sentenced Rastamouse creator Michael De Souza to community service for benefit fraud in September 2019, having consulted with his daughter on the latter. In 2021, he sentenced Simon Levy to three years in prison for two 2018 sexual assaults but declined to impose a Sexual Harm Prevention Order on him, following which Levy murdered two women upon release. He then gave a suspended sentence to a man in 2023 who had driven into the Downing Street security gates and been caught with extreme child abuse images on his phone, having allowed him to cite autism, ADHD, and diabetes as arguments. The following January, he handed a suspended sentence to a serving police officer who had sex with a drunk woman in a patrol car; this was increased to a prison sentence upon review.

In July 2024, Hehir sentenced Roger Hallam to five years in prison and four other protesters to four years each under the Police, Crime, Sentencing and Courts Act 2022 for conspiring to cause a public nuisance by organising direct action protests to block the M25 motorway. His sentences, which drew audible gasps from the gallery, were criticised by the United Nations officials Michel Forst and Volker Türk and by the scientist Bill McGuire. In addition, over 1,200 artists, athletes, and academics including the former Archbishop Rowan Williams, the musicians Chris Martin, Annie Lennox, and the author Philip Pullman signed a letter to the Attorney General for England and Wales condemning the sentences. The sentences were, however, supported by the legal professor and former UKIP candidate Andrew Tettenborn.

Later that month, Hehir convicted Phoebe Plummer and Anna Holland of criminal damage for throwing soup at a painting of Sunflowers by Vincent van Gogh. Just before sentencing, more than a hundred artists, curators and academics signed an open letter coordinated by Greenpeace and Liberate Tate imploring Hehir not to sentence Plummer and Holland to prison, and there was a nearby vigil. Hehir sentenced Plummer to two years for their tomato soup protest and Holland to 20 months. In response to the sentence, activists from Last Generation threw soup at the Embassy of the United Kingdom, Berlin, and similar protests took place outside the embassies of Amsterdam, Paris, and Rome.

His sentences were criticised by George Monbiot, who compared the protesters' actions with those who had earned suspended sentences by Hehir and described him as "the Judge Jeffreys of our time", and by Sarah Manavis of New Statesman, who found allowing autism, ADHD, and diabetes as arguments but not climate change hypocritical. His sentences were also criticised by Alan Rusbridger, and Nadya Tolokonnikova, though Celia Walden was less sympathetic to Plummer and Holland. In December 2024, he gave a suspended sentence to Phil Shiner after he admitted defrauding the Legal Aid Agency to file false claims against British soldiers who fought in Iraq, citing his age and declining health; his sentence was criticised by the politicians Johnny Mercer and Ben Wallace.
