= Phoebe Plummer =

British climate activist (born 2000/2001)

- Born: 2001 (age 24–25); London
- Education: University of Manchester; School of Oriental & African Studies
- Organisation: Just Stop Oil
- Movement: Climate activism
- Criminal charges: Criminal damage, interfering with key national infrastructure, conspiracy to cause a public nuisance
- Criminal penalty: 2 years and 3 months imprisonment, 2 years suspended sentence

Phoebe Plummer (born 2001) is a British climate activist. Initially inspired by a United Nations report from the Intergovernmental Panel on Climate Change, they (Note: Plummer uses they/them pronouns.) joined Just Stop Oil in August 2022 and were arrested three times in their first week. Plummer and Anna Holland were convicted of criminal damage for an October 2022 protest in which they threw tomato soup at a Vincent Van Gogh painting of sunflowers at London's National Gallery. The protest caused worldwide outrage and encouraged other activists to carry out similar actions.

In November 2022, Plummer and other Just Stop Oil activists blocked the M25 motorway, for which Plummer received a suspended prison sentence and was ordered to perform community service. In November 2023, Plummer and other activists caused tailbacks on multiple roads in West London with a slow march protest on the Earls Court Road, for which they were found guilty of interference with key national infrastructure at the first jury trial under section 7 of the Public Order Act 2023.

In March 2024, Plummer was arrested on suspicion of conspiracy to burgle and of sending malicious communication after attempting to deliver a letter to Emily Thornberry MP. Later that month, Plummer was mocked by Wes Streeting MP after delivering a letter intended for Streeting to the wrong address. In July 2024, Plummer was arrested for defacing departure boards at Heathrow Airport. In September, they were sentenced to 24 months in prison for their Sunflowers protest and three months for their slow march. They unsuccessfully appealed the former sentence in 2025.

== Biography ==
Plummer was born in 2001 and has two older brothers. Plummer is queer and non-binary and uses singular they pronouns. Plummer grew up in Chelsea in London and attended St Mary's School Ascot for three years before obtaining A-levels in Chemistry, Computer Studies, and Maths at Mander Portman Woodward College in Kensington. After reading a 2019 United Nations report published by the Intergovernmental Panel on Climate Change, Plummer went vegan, stopped flying, and bought only second-hand clothes. They later began signing petitions, writing to members of parliament, and participating in marches. Plummer spent a short period reading maths and computer science at the University of Manchester but dropped out after suffering a climate-related mental health crisis. They later transferred to the School of Oriental & African Studies in London to study social anthropology.

"I had a turning point this summer when in the UK, we reached 40 degrees. And as we shattered records for the hottest summer on record, I think something else shattered in me. And it was a belief that I've held for my whole life, which is that surely the grownups had it all under control. And you know, as our headlines were filled with stories of reaching temperatures that they didn't predict that we would see until 2050. I realised quite the opposite was happening, that we were hurtling in the wrong direction. I realised the grownups didn't have it under control. The grownups had sat on the knowledge of the consequences of burning fossil fuels for the last 50 years. The grownups were quite happily signing me and my generation up to a future that's filled with storms, wildfires, droughts, crop failures, famine, and war. And I realised that nobody was coming to save us."

— Plummer in an interview in March 2023

In July 2022, after temperatures reached 40 °C (104 °F) in some parts of England, they started non-violent direct action. Around this time, Just Stop Oil started a campaign of rolling roadblocks and protests, which Plummer signed up for in August after feeling as though they had made all the individual lifestyle changes they could make. Within a week, they had been arrested three times, twice for disabling pumps at petrol stations. In October 2022, at a roadblock in Trafalgar Square, Plummer became friends with Anna Holland, a Just Stop Oil member originally from Newcastle upon Tyne. Holland had been struck by Plummer's confidence, outfit, and bright pink hair.

On 14 October 2022, Plummer and Holland entered London's National Gallery, threw Heinz tomato soup at the painting Sunflowers, glued themselves to the wall, and demanded to know whether art was worth more than life, food, and justice. The acid in the soup left permanent pale streaks on its frame and caused damage estimated by the gallery to be worth £10,000; however, a subsequent Freedom of Information request put the cost at about £435. The protest caused worldwide outrage, though some were assuaged by the fact that the painting was behind glass and was itself unharmed, and the pair received significant queerphobic abuse from social media and right-wing newspapers following the incident. Plummer and to a lesser extent Holland became the organisation's most recognised faces and their actions inspired several subsequent climate activists to throw food at paintings around the world. Both Plummer and Holland were arrested for the incident. After being released on bail, they rode the London Underground to a safe house while still wearing their prison uniforms. The pair were covertly photographed laughing during the journey and these images were later sent to a tabloid, sparking further press outrage.

Two weeks later, 45 Just Stop Oil activists blocked the M25 motorway, causing four days of disruption. Some were jailed at HM Prison Bronzefield as a result. Plummer shared a cell with another Just Stop Oil member and regularly encountered other M25 protesters. In an interview with Damian Whitworth of The Times published in July 2024, Plummer stated that they had received "hot food, shelter, clean clothes, [and] warm blankets" in prison, all of which "millions in the global south" had already lost to climate change. In April 2025, Plummer was convicted of conspiracy to cause a public nuisance over their role in the protests; the following month, they were sentenced to 24 months' imprisonment, suspended for two years, and ordered to perform 150 hours of community service and pay £500 in costs.

Plummer posed for Dazed in summer 2023, for which they had 'Stop Oil' written on their chest, held a can of Heinz tomato soup, and wore a silk and cotton sweater by Loro Piana. On 15 November 2023, Plummer, Chiara Sarti, and Daniel Hall mounted a slow march protest as part of a Just Stop Oil campaign that called for the government of the United Kingdom to stop issuing new licences for oil and gas exploitation. Their campaign, which took place along Earls Court Road, caused long tailbacks which extended to Cromwell Road and the Hammersmith flyover, causing several hours of traffic disruption. For this, Plummer and Sarti were held on remand for 18 and 19 days respectively. In March 2024, Plummer was arrested on suspicion of conspiracy to burgle and of sending malicious communication after attempting to deliver a letter to Emily Thornberry MP. Later that month, after attempting to deliver a letter to Wes Streeting MP, he mocked them for delivering to the wrong borough. In April 2024, while wearing an ankle tag, Plummer gave an interview to Tipping Points, a podcast by a student at Imperial College London.

Plummer's November 2023 protest was litigated in front of a jury in May 2024, becoming the first such trial under section 7 of the Public Order Act 2023. Co-defendant Sarti was represented by a lawyer, but Plummer and Hall represented themselves. The trial took place during unusual heat in the courts and several sessions ended early. All the defendants were convicted that month of "interference with key national infrastructure". In July 2024, Plummer and Holland were convicted of causing criminal damage for their tomato soup protest and warned to expect prison. Plummer and another activist were arrested five days afterwards for spraying paint at departure boards at Heathrow Airport, for which they were convicted in May 2026 of criminal damage worth over £5,000.

On 27 September 2024, the day after Plummer turned 23, Judge Christopher Hehir sentenced Plummer to two years for their tomato soup protest and three months for their slow march, ignoring an open letter coordinated by Greenpeace and Liberate Tate imploring him not to sentence the pair to imprisonment. Hehir's sentence prompted activists from Last Generation to throw soup at the Berlin's Embassy of the United Kingdom, similar protests to take place outside the British embassies in Amsterdam, Paris, and Rome, and criticism from George Monbiot and Nadya Tolokonnikova, though Celia Walden was less sympathetic. In January 2025, Plummer, Holland, and fourteen other jailed Just Stop Oil activists challenged the lengths of their sentences at the Court of Appeal; their appeal was supported by Greenpeace, Friends of the Earth, and the great-granddaughter of Emmeline Pankhurst, although Lord Walney criticised the appeal. Plummer was released from prison in April 2025.
