= Just Stop Oil M25 blockade case =

2024 British court case on climate protesters

R v Hallam
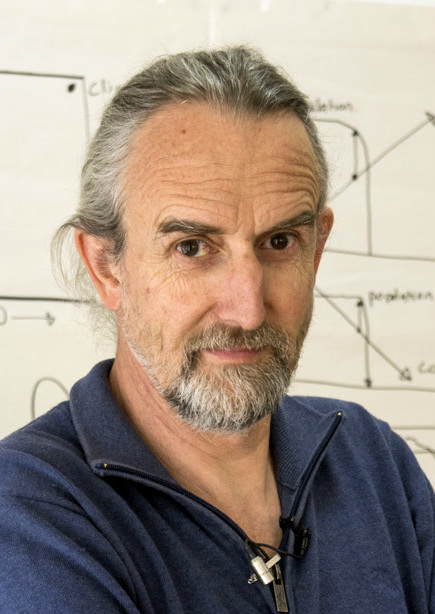
- Roger Hallam in 2020
- Court: Southwark Crown Court
- Full case name: Rex v Hallam and others
- Decided: 18 July 2024

Court membership
- Judge sitting: Christopher Hehir

R v Hallam was a 2024 British court case involving five activists from the climate protest group Just Stop Oil. The activists were convicted of conspiracy to cause public nuisance after they organised protests to block the M25 motorway in November 2022. Roger Hallam, co-founder of Just Stop Oil and Extinction Rebellion, was sentenced to five years' imprisonment, while his fellow activists Daniel Shaw, Louise Lancaster, Lucia Whittaker De Abreu and Cressida Gethin were sentenced to four years each. The activists have been collectively referred to as the "Whole Truth Five" in Just Stop Oil's social media posts.

The severity of the sentences sparked widespread criticism from various quarters. They are thought to be the longest sentences ever given in the UK for non-violent protest. Among the critics are UN Human Rights Commissioner Volker Türk, the United Nations special rapporteur for environmental defenders Michel Forst, Amnesty International and former Archbishop of Canterbury Rowan Williams.

== Background ==
Just Stop Oil is a British environmental activist group focused on the issue of human-caused climate change. It was founded in February 2022 with the primary objective of convincing the UK government to stop licensing new oil and gas projects. Just Stop Oil has often received criticism for using illegal and disruptive tactics in its protests, such as vandalism and traffic obstruction, although the group is committed to non-violence.

== M25 protests ==
On 7 November 2022 dozens of Just Stop Oil activists climbed onto gantries over London's orbital motorway, the M25. This resulted in police stopping the traffic, causing gridlock. The protests continued for four consecutive days, ending on 11 November, and involved 45 activists in total. Later at the trial, the prosecution alleged the protest caused economic losses of £765,000, and cost the Metropolitan Police more than £1.1 million. They also alleged it caused over 50,000 hours of vehicle delay, affecting at least 700,000 vehicles.

== Trial ==
The trial was held at Southwark Crown Court under Judge Christopher Hehir and lasted for two and a half weeks. All the defendants represented themselves during the trial, although three instructed counsel to speak on their behalf during mitigation.

The court heard that Roger Hallam, Daniel Shaw, Louise Lancaster, Lucia Whittaker De Abreu and Cressida Gethin had spoken on a Zoom call organised to recruit potential volunteers for the M25 protest.

On the second day of defence evidence, eleven people were arrested for alleged contempt of court after protesting outside the court holding signs saying "jurors have the right to hear the whole truth". By the final day there were more than 80 protestors outside the courtroom. The court dropped its proceedings against the eleven arrested.

Over the course of the trial, the defendants caused disruption by refusing to leave the witness stand and speaking out of turn. By the end of the trial, four of the five defendants had been remanded to custody after police were called to court seven times to make arrests. As punishment, Judge Hehir reduced the time given to each defendant from one hour to twenty minutes. Furthermore, he prohibited them from using climate crisis as a defence for their actions.

On 11 July, the jury unanimously found the defendants guilty of conspiracy to cause public nuisance under the Police, Crime, Sentencing and Courts Act 2022 and the Criminal Law Act 1977. Seven days later, Judge Hehir sentenced Hallam to five years' imprisonment, while co-defendants Shaw, Lancaster, Whittaker De Abreu and Gethin were sentenced to four years apiece. These are thought to be the longest sentences ever given in the UK for non-violent protest. The previous longest sentences were received by Just Stop Oil activists Morgan Trowland and Marcus Decker, who were jailed for three years and two years and seven months, respectively, for scaling the Queen Elizabeth II Bridge on the Dartford Crossing in October 2022.

The judge in his sentencing remarks stated that "this was a conspiracy to cause extreme and disproportionate disruption" and the Zoom call recording "reveals how deeply involved in the conspiracy each of you was." Factors that led to the long sentences included the very high level of disruption, the even higher level of disruption intended, and the fact that each of the defendants had at least one previous conviction for direct action protest and was on bail for at least one other set of proceedings. The judge wrote that "there is a real risk of each of you committing further serious offences in pursuit of your objectives, unless you are deterred from doing so by exemplary sentences in this case ... Such sentences will also hopefully deter others."

== Reactions ==
UN Human Rights Commissioner Volker Türk described the sentences as "deeply troubling". Michel Forst, the United Nations special rapporteur for environmental defenders, attended two days of the trial and was critical of the proceedings, stating that such severe sentences for non-violent protest are "not acceptable in a democracy". Forst stated "Mr. Shaw may reasonably expect to face a prison sentence of up to two years (or more) for, in essence, his participation in a Zoom call to discuss a proposed peaceful environmental protest. The imposition of such sanction is not only appalling but may also violate the United Kingdom’s obligations under international law." Amnesty International UK's human rights adviser, Tom Southerden, described the sentences as "draconian" and urged the government to repeal the sections of the Police, Crime, Sentencing and Courts Act 2022 that legislate the offence of public nuisance used against the defendants.

Prominent figures, including TV presenter and environmentalist Chris Packham, TV chef Hugh Fearnley-Whittingstall, entrepreneur Dale Vince, Green Party peer Jenny Jones, Green Party MP Siân Berry and Labour Party MP Clive Lewis spoke out against the sentencing. Over 1200 artists, athletes and academics signed a letter to the Attorney General, calling for an urgent meeting to discuss "the jailing of truth tellers and their silencing in court". Among the signatories were former Archbishop of Canterbury Rowan Williams, musicians Chris Martin and Annie Lennox, and author Philip Pullman. A spokesman for the Attorney General's office stated that "the Attorney General has no power to intervene in these cases".

In contrast, Andrew Tettenborn, a professor of law at Swansea University, spoke out in favour of the sentencing in an article in The Spectator.

The UK government refused to comment on the sentencing, with a spokesman for the prime minister stating that "it is not for politicians to intervene" in matters of judgement and sentencing.

== Punishments ==
58 year‑old Louise Lancaster published her experiences of the trial and of life in a United Kingdom prison from July to December 2024 in a national newspaper.

== Appeal ==
On 13 August 2024 lawyers acting on behalf of the five activists announced they intended to appeal the ruling, arguing that the sentences were excessive. Appeal proceedings commenced on Wednesday 29 January 2025 before the full bench of the Court of Appeal. On March 7, 2025, the Court of Appeal reduced the sentence of the five, though it upheld the sentences of 10 other protesters. Hallam's sentence was reduced from five years to four years. Shaw and Lancaster's sentences were reduced from four years to three years, while Whittaker De Abreu and Gethin's sentences were reduced from four years to 30 months.
