= Royal Courts of Justice =

Court building in London, England

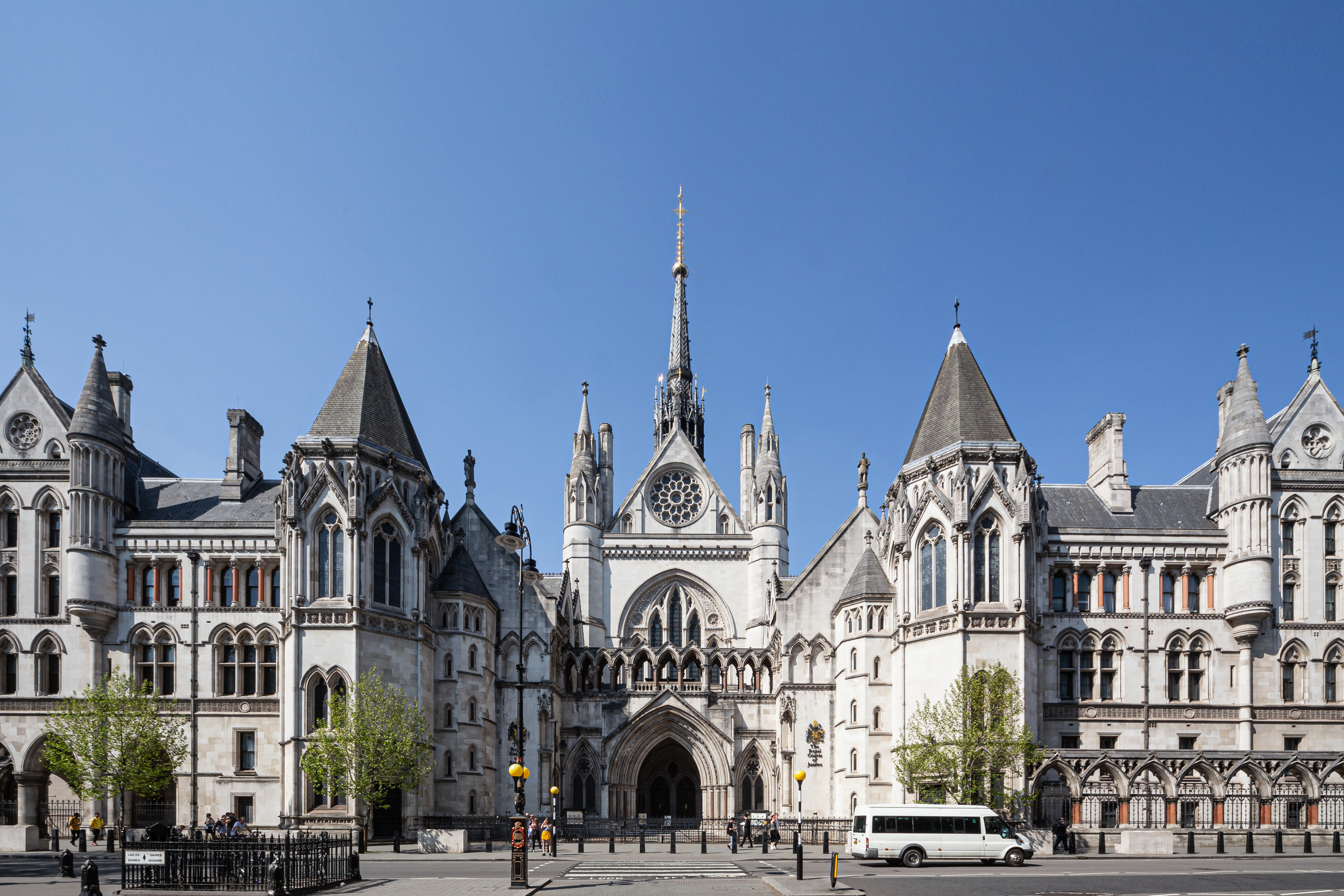
- The façade on the Strand

General information
- Status: Completed
- Type: Court
- Architectural style: Gothic Revival
- Location: Strand; City of Westminster, London, WC2
- Coordinates: 51°30′49″N 0°06′48″W
- Current tenants: HM Courts & Tribunals Service
- Groundbreaking: 1873
- Opened: 1882; 144 years ago
- Cost: < £1 million

Technical details
- Material: Portland stone ashlar and red bricks with granite, marble and red sandstone dressings and slate and lead roofing
- Floor count: Five

Design and construction
- Architect: George Edmund Street
- Main contractor: Messrs Bull & Sons

Other information
- Public transit: Temple

Website
- Official website

Listed Building – Grade I
- Official name: Royal Courts of Justice: The Law Courts, Screen Walls, Gates, Railings and Lamps
- Designated: 5 February 1970
- Reference no.: 1264258

The Royal Courts of Justice, commonly called the Law Courts, is a court building in Westminster which houses the High Court and Court of Appeal of England and Wales. The High Court also sits on circuit and in other major cities. Designed by George Edmund Street, who died before it was completed, it is a large grey stone edifice in the Victorian Gothic Revival style built in the 1870s and opened by Queen Victoria in 1882. It is one of the largest courts in Europe. It is a Grade I listed building.

It is located on the Strand within the City of Westminster, near the boundary with the City of London (Temple Bar). It is surrounded by the four Inns of Court, St Clement Danes church, the Australian High Commission, King's College London and the London School of Economics. The nearest London Underground stations are Chancery Lane and Temple.

== History ==
Courts of Justice Building Act 1865 (Note: Section 1.)
- Act of Parliament
- Parliament of the United Kingdom
- Long title: An Act to supply Means towards defraying the Expenses of providing Courts of Justice and the various Offices belonging thereto; and for other Purposes.
- Citation: 28 & 29 Vict. c. 48
- Territorial extent: United Kingdom

Dates
- Royal assent: 19 June 1865
- Commencement: 19 June 1865 (Note: The Acts of Parliament (Commencement) Act 1793.)
- Repealed: 27 July 1971
Other legislation
Amended by	Statute Law Revision Act 1875; Statute Law Revision Act 1950; Statute Law Revision Act 1963; Administration of Justice Act 1965
Repealed by	Statute Law (Repeals) Act 1971

Status: Repealed

Text of statute as originally enacted

Courts of Justice Concentration (Site) Act 1865
- Act of Parliament
- Parliament of the United Kingdom
- Long title: An Act to enable the Commissioners of Her Majesty's Works and Public Buildings to acquire a Site for the Erection and Concentration of Courts of Justice, and of the various Offices belonging to the same.
- Citation: 28 & 29 Vict. c. 49
- Territorial extent: United Kingdom

Dates
- Royal assent: 19 June 1865
- Commencement: 19 June 1865
- Repealed: 16 June 1977
Other legislation
Amended by	Administration of Justice Act 1965
Repealed by	Statute Law (Repeals) Act 1977

Status: Repealed

Text of statute as originally enacted

For centuries these courts were located in Westminster Hall; however, in the 19th century, justices decided the courts needed a purpose-built structure. Much of the preparatory legal work was completed by Edwin Wilkins Field including promotion of the Courts of Justice Building Act 1865 (28 & 29 Vict. c. 48) and the Courts of Justice Concentration (Site) Act 1865 (28 & 29 Vict. c. 49). A statue of Field stands in the building. Parliament paid £1,453,000 for the 6-acre (24,000 m^{2}) site upon which 450 houses had to be demolished.

The search for a design for the Law Courts was by way of a competition, a then-common approach to selecting a design and an architect. The competition ran from 1866 to 1867 and the twelve architects competing for the contract each submitted designs for the site. In 1868 it was finally decided that George Edmund Street was the winner. Building was started in 1873 by Messrs Bull & Sons of Southampton. Its masons led a serious strike at an early stage which threatened to extend to the other trades and caused a temporary stoppage of the works. In consequence, foreign workmen were brought in – mostly Germans. This aroused bitter hostility on the part of the men on strike, and the newcomers had to be housed and fed within the building. However, these disputes were eventually settled and the building took eight years to complete; it was officially opened by Queen Victoria on 4 December 1882.

Street died before the building was opened, overcome by the work. The building was paid for by cash accumulated in court from the estates of the intestate to the sum of £700,000. Oak work and fittings in the court cost a further £70,000 and with decoration and furnishing the total cost for the building came to under £1 million.

The building was extended to the designs of Sir Henry Tanner to create the West Green building completed in 1912. The Queen's Building followed in 1968 and the Thomas More Courts were completed in January 1990.

The building was used as a "Nightingale Court" for criminal trials during the COVID-19 pandemic in 2021.

On 8 September 2025, a mural by Banksy was discovered. The mural depicted a judge using a gavel to beat a protester holding a placard. Banksy took credit for the art piece on social media later the same day. The mural was then covered up and guarded by security staff before being removed.

== Architecture ==
The design involves a symmetrical main frontage facing The Strand; the central section, which is stepped back, features an arched doorway leading to the Great Hall; it has a five-part window in a carved surround on the first floor and a gable containing a rose window above. At the top of the gable is a sculpture of Jesus with a flèche behind. There are also statues of Moses, Solomon and Alfred the Great, the four statues symbolising the pillars of English legal tradition. There are towers containing lancet windows on either side of the central section with side wings beyond. At the eastern end of the Strand frontage is a tall clock tower topped by a pyramidal roof, finial and flagpole; it contains a clock and five bells (weighing a total of 8¼ tons) by Gillett, Bland & Co.

Internally, courts are arranged off the Great Hall which runs north–south; there is a courtyard to the east with offices for courtroom staff arranged round the courtyard. The Great Hall contains a bust of Queen Victoria by the sculptor, Alfred Gilbert.

Architectural historian Nikolaus Pevsner has described the building as "an object lesson in free composition, with none of the symmetry of the classics, yet not undisciplined where symmetry is abandoned". David Brownlee has claimed that it was influenced by the reformist political movement and the High Victorian architectural movement and has described it as a "regular mongrel affair" while Turnor described it as the "last great secular building of the Gothic Revival".

The Government Art Collection contains a painting by Henry Tanworth Wells depicting Queen Victoria opening the building in 1882.

== Gallery ==
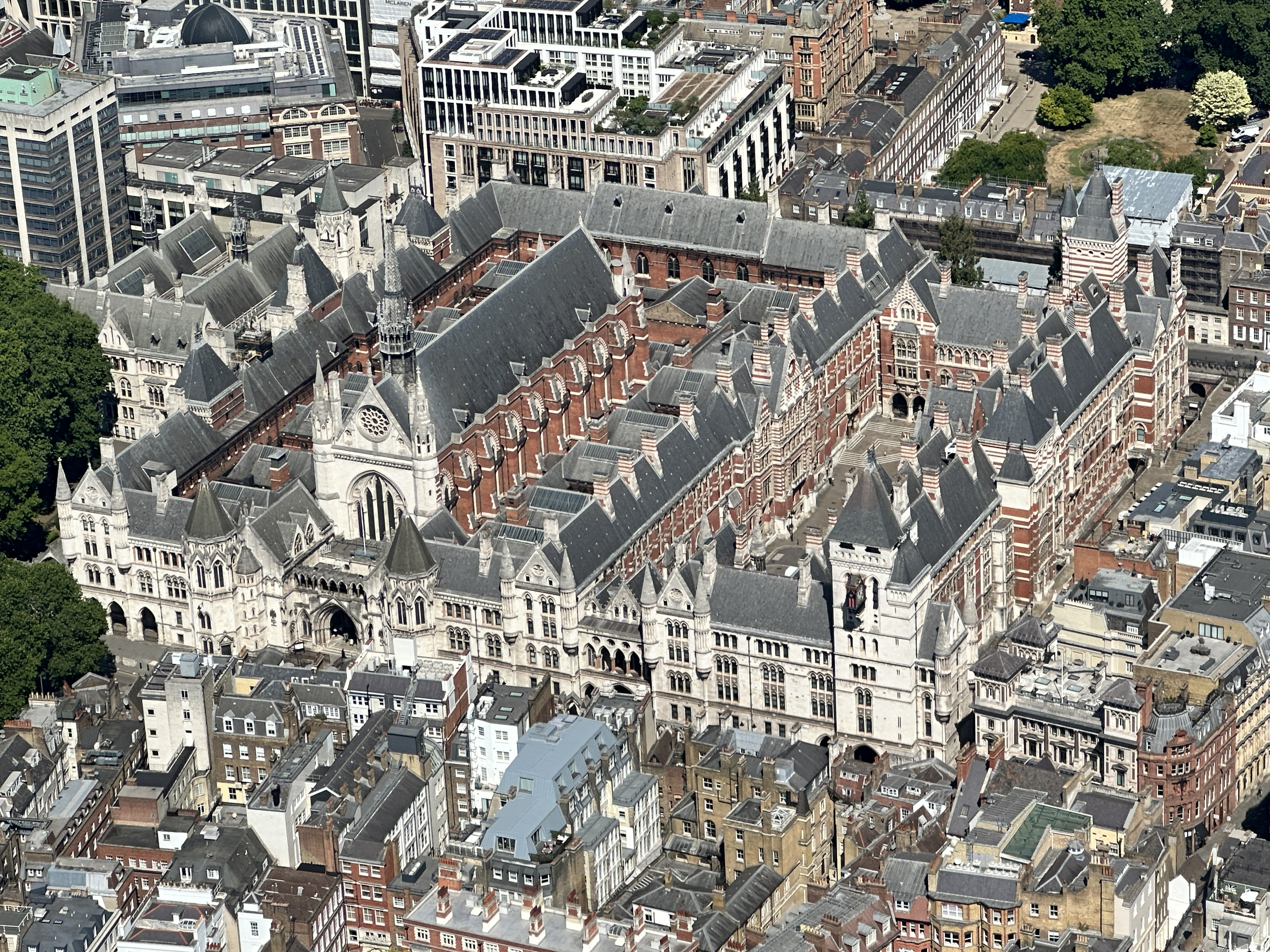
Bird's-eye view

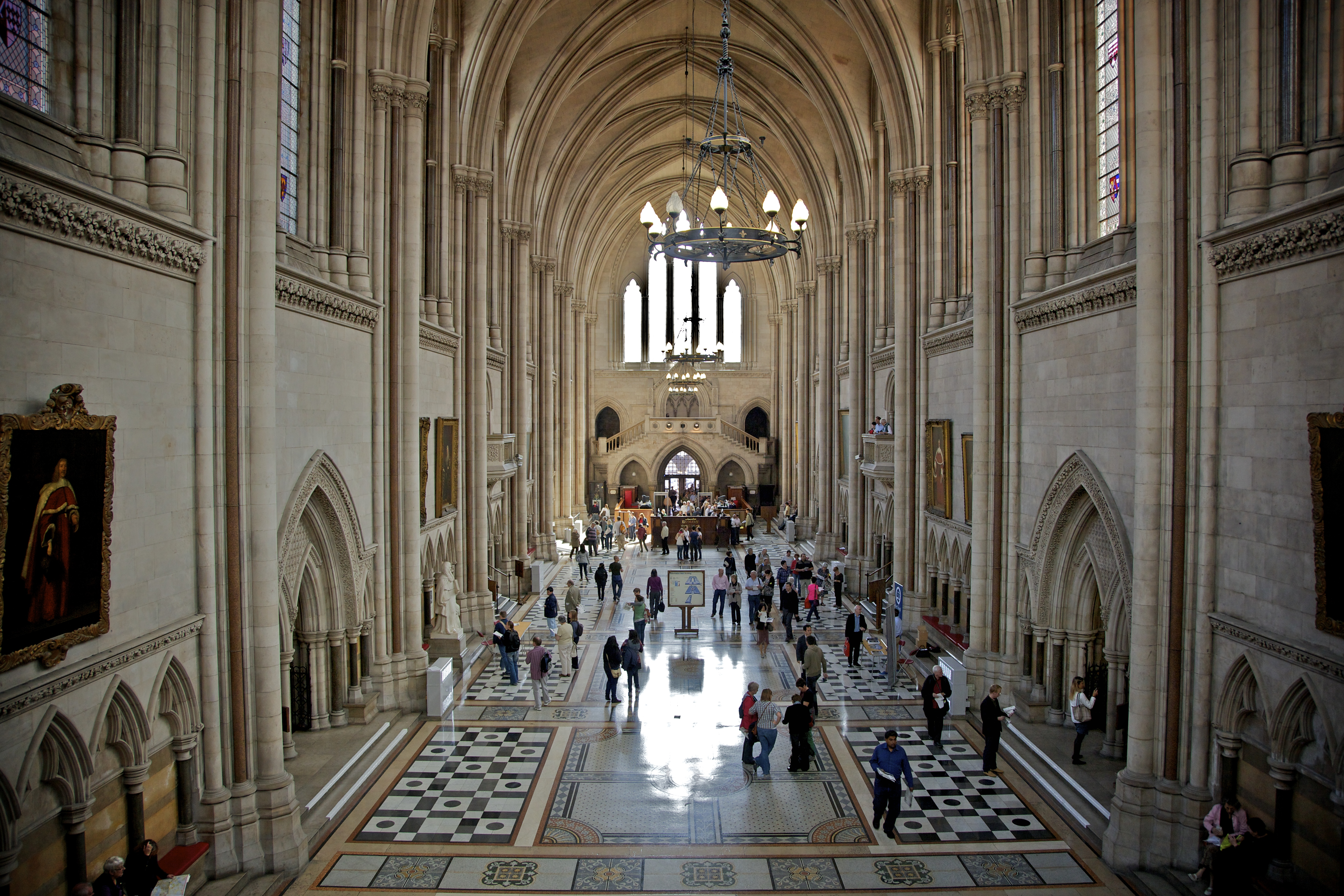
The Great Hall

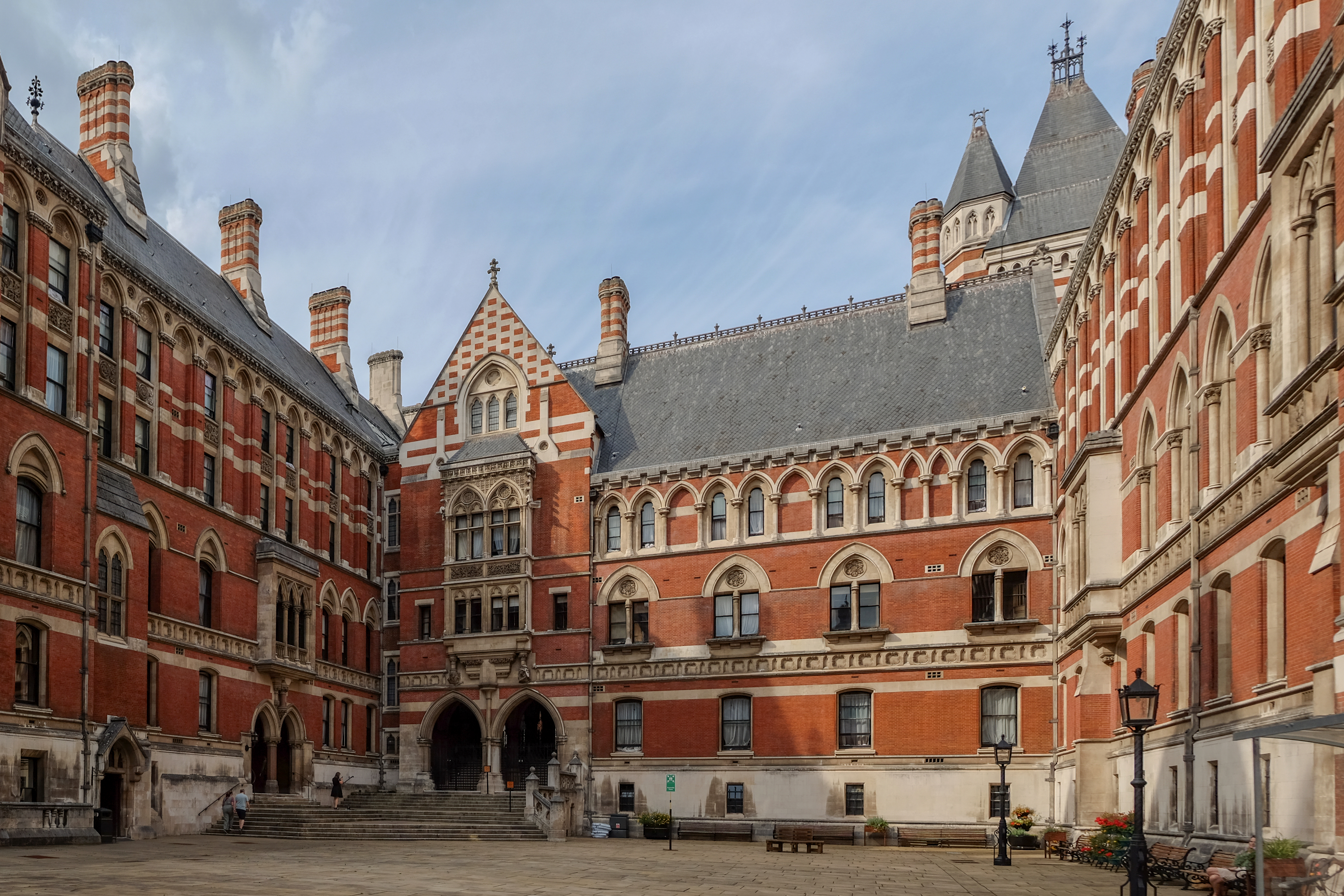
North face of the quadrangle

== See also ==
- Courts of England and Wales
- Royal Courts of Justice, Belfast
- Parliament House, Edinburgh

== Sources ==
- Harper, Roger H. (1983). Victorian Architectural Competitions: An Index to British and Irish Architectural Competitions in The Builder, 1843–1900. Mansell Publishing Limited. ISBN 0-7201-1685-6.
