= Roger Hallam (activist) =

British environmental activist and co-founder of Extinction Rebellion

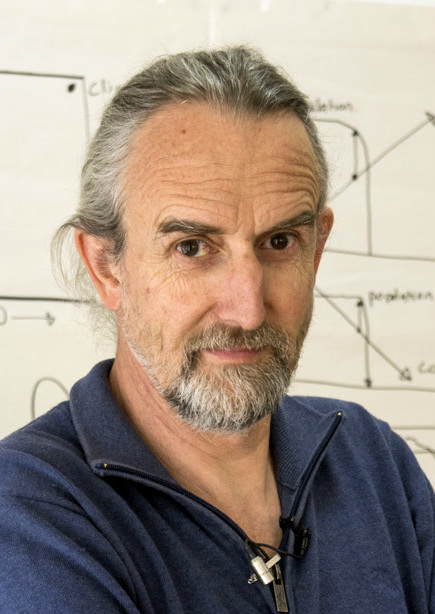
- Hallam in 2020

Leader of Burning Pink
- In office 2020–2022
- Preceded by: Party founded
- Succeeded by: Party dissolved

Personal details
- Born: 1965 or 1966 (age 60–61) United Kingdom
- Occupation: Environmental activist
- Known for: Co-founding Extinction Rebellion and Just Stop Oil
- Political party: Shake It Up
- Criminal charges: Conspiracy to cause a public nuisance
- Criminal penalty: 4 years' imprisonment
- Website: rogerhallam.com

Julian Roger Hallam (born 1965/1966) is an environmental activist known for having co-founded Extinction Rebellion, Just Stop Oil, Insulate Britain, the cooperative federation organisation Radical Routes, and the political party Burning Pink. In April 2024, Hallam was given a suspended two-year sentence for attempting to block Heathrow Airport with drones. In July 2024, Hallam was convicted of conspiracy to cause a public nuisance for organising protests to block the M25 motorway two years prior, for which he was sentenced to five years' imprisonment. On appeal this sentence was reduced to four years.

== Biography ==
=== Early life ===
Hallam was raised by a 'strict and traditional' Methodist family. His parents were both active members of the Liberal Party. His father worked as a factory manager, and his mother was a minister with the local Methodist church. He grew up in Hazel Grove, a suburb of Stockport.

At the age of 18, Hallam travelled to India as part of the Student Christian Movement to work with civil rights groups in Raipur. He then went to the London School of Economics, but left after a year to become a full-time campaigner.

=== Work and further study ===
In 1987, Hallam lived on South Road in Hockley, working as a voluntary worker.

In 1990, he was part of a cooperative that opened a vegetarian cafe in Saltley. From May 1993, he was part an organic food cooperative on South Road in Hockley, after living in West Virginia. He lived in a communal-type house, with around six people, with division of labour.

He was previously an organic farmer on a 10-acre (4-hectare) smallholding near Llandeilo in South Wales; he attributes the destruction of his business to a series of extreme weather events.

Between at least 2017 and early 2019, he was studying for a PhD at King's College London, researching how to achieve social change through civil disobedience and radical movements.

=== Political activity ===
Hallam appeared at Bow Street Magistrates Court for daubing anti-nuclear peace messages on the Ministry of Defence building on Ash Wednesday in 1987. In 1988, he appeared at Birmingham Crown Court for daubing feminist messages on car advert display boards saying 'This oppresses women' in July 1987 on an Austin Maestro advert in Hockley Circus.

Later in 2017, Hallam was a leading member of activist group Stop Killing Londoners, an anti-pollution campaign of mass civil disobedience that they hoped would result in the arrest and imprisonment of activists. Hallam, with Stuart Basden, Ian Bray and Genny Scherer, were prosecuted, and some pledged to go on hunger strike if imprisoned.

Hallam is a co-founder of the environmental pressure group Extinction Rebellion, with Gail Bradbrook and Simon Bramwell. He stood unsuccessfully in the 2019 European Parliament election in the London constituency as an independent, winning 924 of the 2,241,681 votes cast (0.04%).

In September 2023, Hallam was ranked thirty-fourth on the New Statesman's Left Power List of influential left-wing figures in the UK.

Aaron Gell, a journalist at The New Republic, summarises Hallam's protest philosophy as advocating disruptive and resolutely nonviolent protests, and that "Like business start-ups, movements need to experiment, learn from failure, and rapidly iterate". Furthermore, Gell commented that their organisation needs "a careful balance between accountable leadership with individual empowerment". By 2025, Hallam's focus had shifted to political revolution, arguing that the world is in a "pre-revolutionary period" before the existing political order falls, and a democratic revolution is the only alternative to authoritarianism. Hallam argues that a revolution should aim to reinvent democracy by using citizens' assemblies selected through sortition as the key decision-making organs of government, while elections would become less important.

=== Criminal damage charges ===
In January 2017, in an action to urge King's College London to divest from fossil fuels, Hallam and David Durant, using water-soluble chalk-based spray paint, painted "Divest from oil and gas", "Now!" and "Out of time" on the university's Strand Campus entrance. and were fined £500. In February, they again spray painted the university's Great Hall causing a claimed £7000 worth of damage and were arrested.

In May 2019, after a three-day trial at Southwark Crown Court for criminal damage, they were cleared by a jury of all charges, having argued in their defence that their actions were a proportionate response to the climate crisis, with Hallam arguing his actions were lawful under an exemption in the Criminal Damage Act that permits damage if it protects another's property. In March 2017, Hallam went on a 14 day hunger strike to demand the university divest from fossil fuels, as the institution had millions of pounds invested in fossil fuels but no investment in renewable energy. Five weeks after the first protest, the university removed £14 million worth of investments from fossil fuel companies and pledged to become carbon neutral by 2025.

=== Controversial comments and writing on genocide and sexual offences ===
In an interview with Die Zeit on 20 November 2019, Hallam said that genocides are "like a regular event" in history and he also called the Holocaust "just another fuckery in human history". He made this comment in the context of a broader discussion about genocides which have been committed throughout human history, in which Hallam compared the Nazi Holocaust to the atrocities in the Congo Free State in the late 19th century stating, the "fact of the matter is, millions of people have been killed in vicious circumstances on a regular basis throughout history" and he also stated that the Belgians "went to the Congo in the late 19th century and decimated it."

According to Aaron Gell, "Hallam's point was that the exceptionalism with which we treat the Nazi murder project can blind us to the many other genocides committed over the centuries and, more importantly, to the era of mass death we're presently teeing up. It wasn't taken that way." Hallam's controversial comparison drew support from African activists from the Stop the Maangamizi: We Charge Genocide/Ecocide! Campaign, who were critical of the tone of his language but lauded him for his honesty and his willingness to highlight the crimes which colonial powers committed in Africa. However, his comments about the Holocaust, perceived by some as anti-Semitic, resulted in his expulsion from Extinction Rebellion in 2020.

In a self-published pamphlet which he wrote in prison in 2019, Hallam wrote that the climate crisis would lead to mass rape, and he featured a story in which the reader's female family members are gang raped and the reader is forced to watch. The pamphlet was condemned by Farah Nazeer, CEO of Women's Aid. When Der Spiegel replied to Hallam that "You can't blame the climate change for the rape of women during war", Hallam's response was "No, climate change is just the tubes that the gas comes down in the gas chamber. It's just a mechanism through which one generation kills the next generation".

=== Attempted closure of Heathrow airport ===
Hallam and four other activists were arrested on suspicion of conspiracy to cause a public nuisance on 12 September 2019, the day before a planned action to pilot drones in the exclusion zone around Heathrow Airport in order to disrupt flights. Three days later, in an action organised by Heathrow Pause, Hallam was arrested in the vicinity of Heathrow Airport, apparently in breach of bail conditions from the previous arrest requiring him not to be within 5 miles (8 kilometres) of any airport or possess drone equipment. He was remanded in custody until 14 October.

On 5 April 2024, Hallam was given a two year prison sentence, suspended for 18 months, for plotting to close Heathrow Airport using drones as a way of showing opposition to the opening of a third runway at the airport. Hallam and his co-defendants had claimed that the act was "merely a publicity exercise". However, this defence was rejected by the jury.

=== M25 blocking ===
==== Trial ====
On 11 July 2024, Hallam and four co‑defendants were tried for conspiring to block traffic on the M25 motorway, London's main orbital motorway. Hallam had been arrested in a dawn raid at his home on 18 October 2023. The defendants' plan resulted in several days of disruption on the motorway. The jury trial took place in London and was marked by outbursts from the defendants after a ruling from Judge Christopher Hehir prohibiting them from using climate breakdown as a defence for their actions. At one point, Hallam refused to leave the witness box and was arrested for contempt and sent to the cells. The police were called to court on seven occasions and made several arrests. The trial judge indicated that Hallam and his co‑defendants will face multi‑year prison sentences.

==== Found guilty, and sentenced to five years imprisonment ====
The jury found Hallam and his co-conspirators guilty of causing a public nuisance by unanimous verdict. Judge Christopher Hehir said the defendants had "crossed the line from concerned campaigner to fanatic". On 18 July 2024, at Southwark Crown Court, Hallam was sentenced to five years' imprisonment, while the other four defendants each received four-year jail terms.

==== Appeal and conditional release ====
The five year sentence was reduced to four years by the Court of Appeal on 7 March 2025, with the country's most senior judge ruling that it was "manifestly excessive". Sentences for five more of the total of 16 co-defendants in the appeal were also reduced, leaving 10 other sentences unchanged. Raj Chada, representing Hallam and the other protestors, said they were reviewing the Court of Appeal judgement and considering a final appeal to the Supreme Court.

On 14 August 2025, he was released from HMP Wayland on provisional release.

==== Commentary on the sentencing ====
UN Rapporteur for environmental defenders Michel Forst spent time at the trial and was critical of the proceedings. Prominent figures including TV presenter and environmentalist Chris Packham, TV chef Hugh Fearnley-Whittingstall, entrepreneur Dale Vince, Green Party peer Jenny Jones, and Labour Party MP Clive Lewis, spoke out against the sentencing. In contrast, Andrew Tettenborn, a professor of law at Swansea University, spoke out in favour of Hallam's sentencing, prior to the Court of Appeal ruling it "manifestly excessive".

The government refused to comment on the sentencing, with a spokeswoman for the prime minister stating that "the judgments and sentencing is for independent judges to make". Similarly a spokesperson for the attorney general's office stated that "Decisions to prosecute, convict and sentence are, rightly, made independently of government by the Crown Prosecution Service, juries and judges respectively. The attorney general has no power to intervene."

A YouGov opinion poll in October 2024 found that the majority of the 2200 adults polled in the survey either supported the prison sentences that had been given or preferred even longer.

== Personal life ==
Hallam has one daughter.

== See also ==
- Environmental law
- Fossil fuels lobby
