= Nightingale Court =

Temporary court in England and Wales

A Nightingale Court is a temporary court in England and Wales established in response to the COVID-19 pandemic. In July 2020, Robert Buckland, the United Kingdom's Secretary of State for Justice, announced that ten temporary courts would be established in venues across England and Wales, including a medieval chamber and at the headquarters of the Ministry of Justice, saying that they would help with "reducing delays and delivering speedier justice for victims". Their role was to hear civil and family cases, tribunals work, and non-custodial criminal cases. The new courts would provide more room in current courts for hearings where cells and secure dock facilities are needed, including jury trials where the defendant is in custody. They were a response to the closure of about half of existing courts unable to provide services in lockdown conditions where, for example, jury trials could not be held as large, well-ventilated spaces were not available.

The term for the temporary courts is derived from the establishment of temporary hospitals to house the surplus of patients created by the COVID-19 pandemic, the first being NHS Nightingale in Canning Town, East London. The hospital is named after the nursing pioneer Florence Nightingale.

In September 2020 a temporary court was established at the Lowry Theatre in Salford, Greater Manchester. A further court was also established at Birmingham Repertory Theatre from December 2020 to July 2021. This move was not well received, with press reports highlighting that the move had "alienated staff, audiences and cultural workforce", leading to criticism from prominent figures, including the comedian Joe Lycett and the ending of a partnership with Talawa Theatre Company.

In Lancaster, the old Magistrates' Court within the Town Hall was brought back into use as a Nightingale Court while the Ashton Hall was similarly used as an emergency Crown Court.

In March 2022 it was announced that about half of the Nightingale courts were to close. While lockdown no longer applied, half were left open to help deal with a very large backlog of cases; even before the COVID-19 pandemic the court system was stretched. Eleven courts were scheduled to close at the end of March: in Middlesbrough, Peterborough, Nottingham, Warwick, Manchester, Liverpool, Bolton, Chester, Winchester, Barbican and Croydon. Courts in Maidstone, Chichester, Telford, Wolverhampton, Birmingham, Leeds, Swansea, Cirencester, Fleetwood, and Petty France and Monument in London were to stay open until March 2023.
