= Sunflowers (Van Gogh series) =

Series of paintings by Vincent van Gogh

- Fourth Version
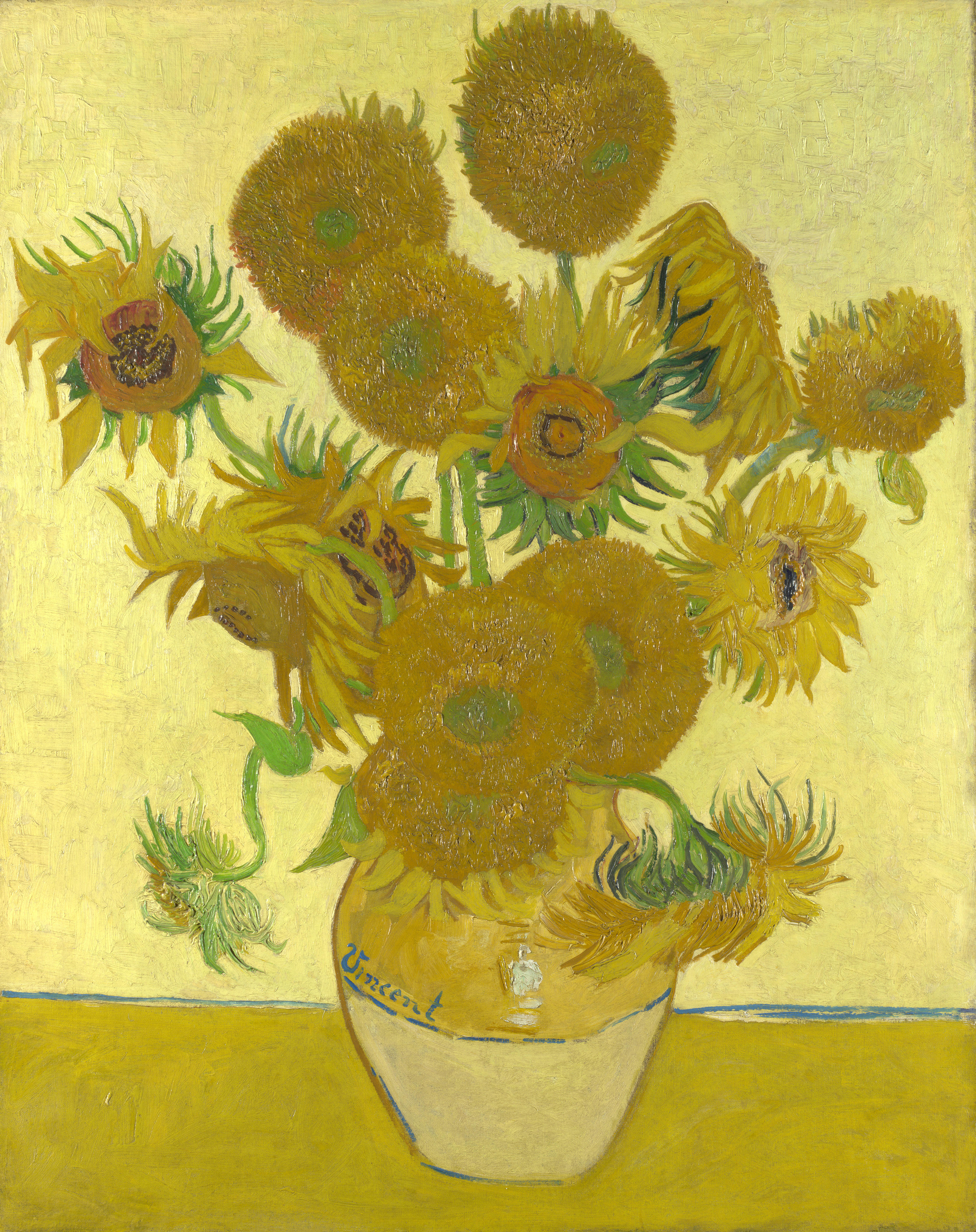
- Artist: Vincent van Gogh
- Year: 1888
- Catalogue: F454; JH1562
- Medium: Oil on canvas
- Dimensions: 92.2 cm × 73 cm (36.3 in × 29 in)
- Location: National Gallery, London

Sunflowers (original title, in French: Tournesols) is the title of two series of still life paintings by the Dutch painter Vincent van Gogh. The first series, executed in Paris in 1887, depicts the flowers lying on the ground, while the second set, made a year later in Arles, shows a bouquet of sunflowers in a vase. In the artist's mind, both sets were linked by the name of his friend Paul Gauguin, who acquired two of the Paris versions. About eight months later, van Gogh hoped to welcome and impress Gauguin again with Sunflowers, now part of the painted Décoration for the Yellow House that he prepared for the guestroom of his home in Arles, where Gauguin was supposed to stay.

== The Paris Sunflowers ==
Little is known of van Gogh's activities during the two years he lived with his brother Theo in Paris, from 1886 to 1888. The fact that he had painted Sunflowers already is only revealed in the spring of 1889, when Gauguin claimed one of the Arles versions in exchange for studies he had left behind after leaving Arles for Paris. Van Gogh was upset and replied that Gauguin had absolutely no right to make this request:

I am definitely keeping my sunflowers in question. He has two of them already, let that hold him. And if he is not satisfied with the exchange he has made with me, he can take back his little Martinique canvas, and his self-portrait sent to me from Brittany, at the same time giving me back both my portrait and the two sunflower canvases which he has taken to Paris. So if he ever broaches this subject again, I've told you just how matters stand.

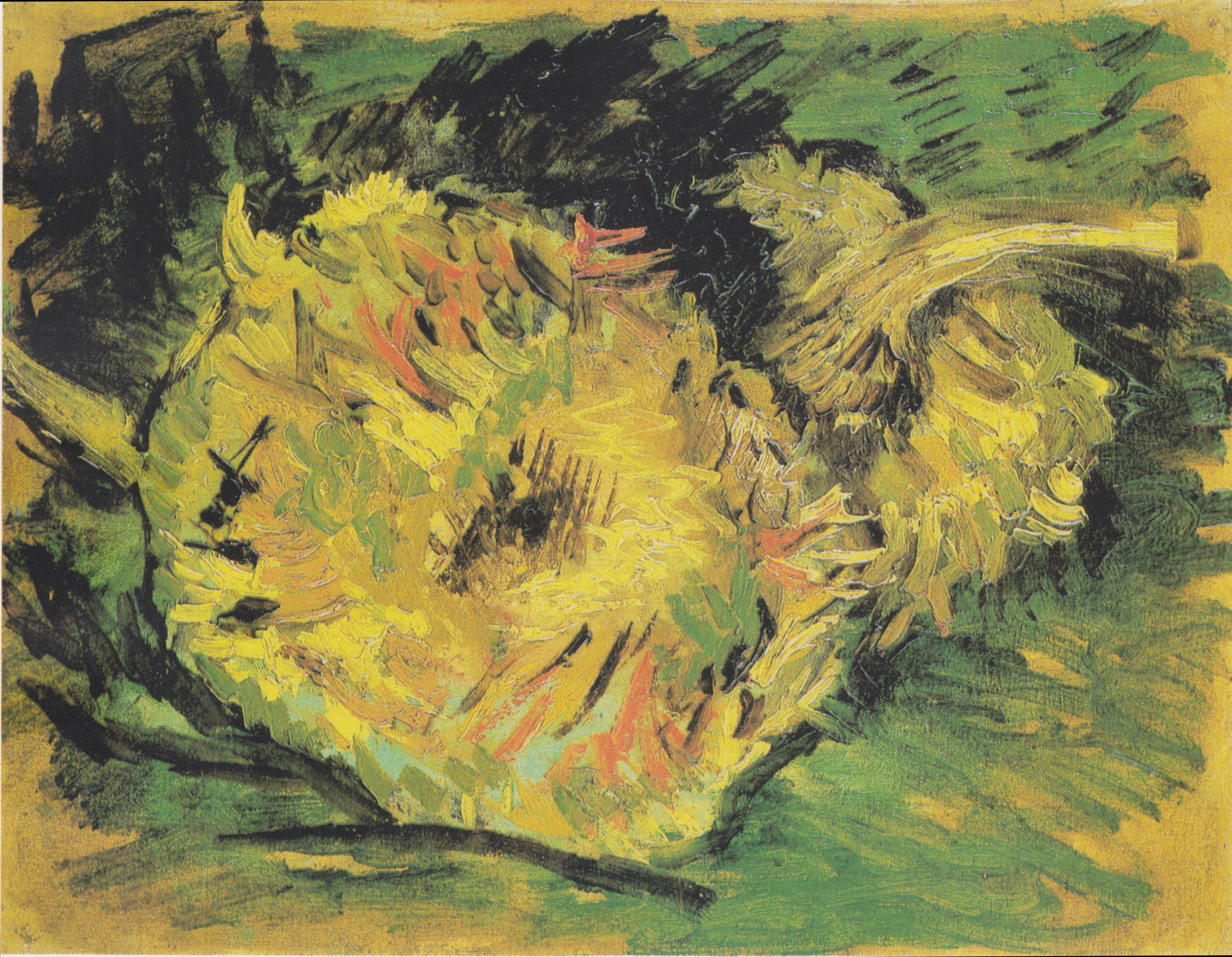
Two Cut Sunflowers, study (F377), Oil on canvas, 21 x 27 cm, Van Gogh Museum, Amsterdam

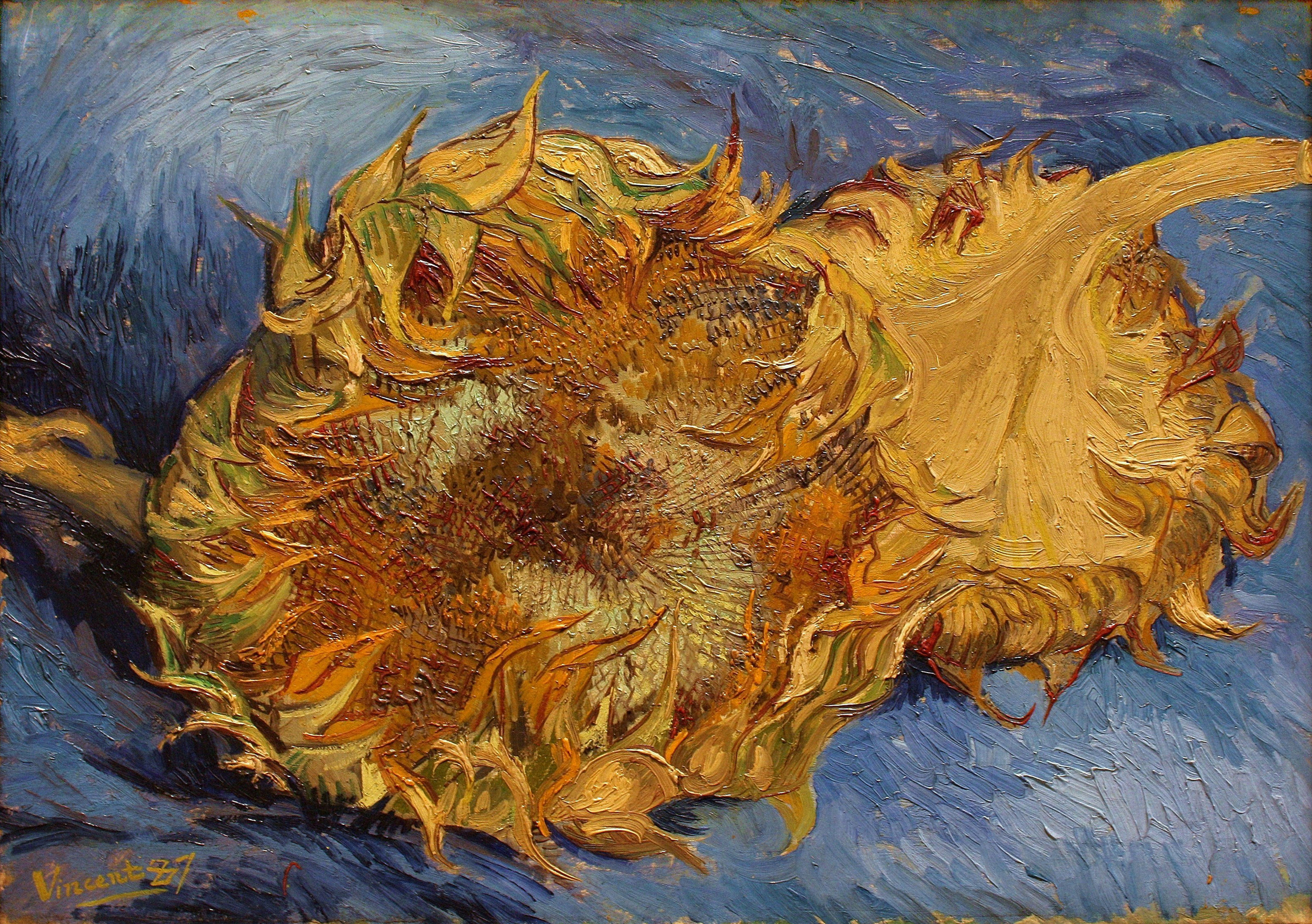
Two Cut Sunflowers (F375), Oil on canvas, 43.2 x 61 cm, Metropolitan Museum of Art, New York

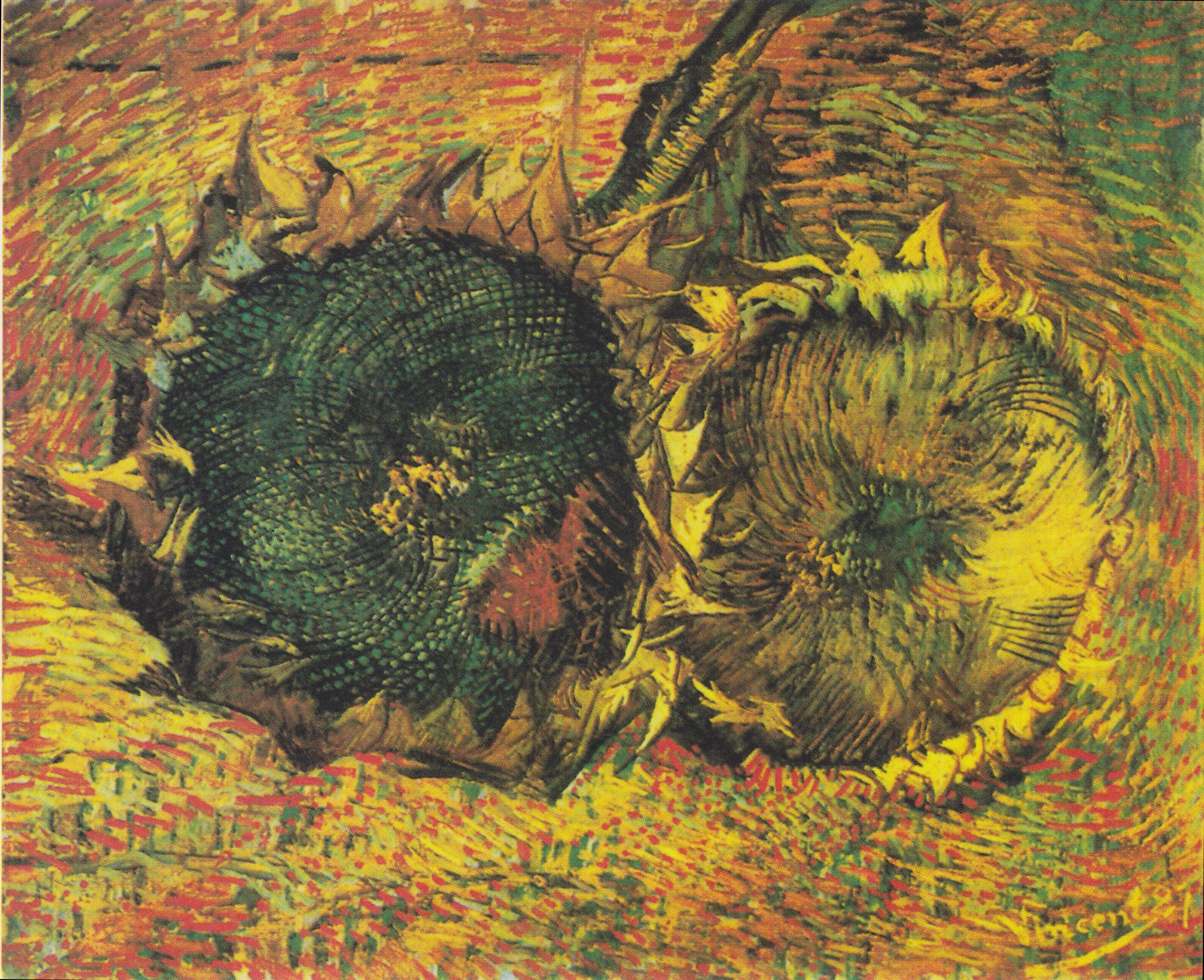
Two Cut Sunflowers (F376), Oil on canvas, 50 x 60.7 cm, Museum of Fine Arts Bern

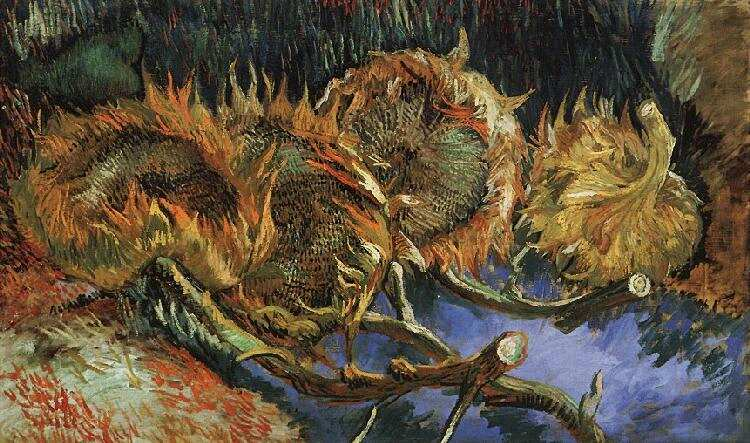
Four Cut Sunflowers (F452), Oil on canvas, 60 × 100 cm, Kröller-Müller Museum, Otterlo

F.Numbers refer to De la Faille Catalogue raisonné

The two Sunflowers in question show two buttons each; one of them was preceded by a small study, and a fourth large canvas combines both compositions.

These were van Gogh's first paintings with "nothing but sunflowers"—yet, he had already included sunflowers in still life and landscape earlier.

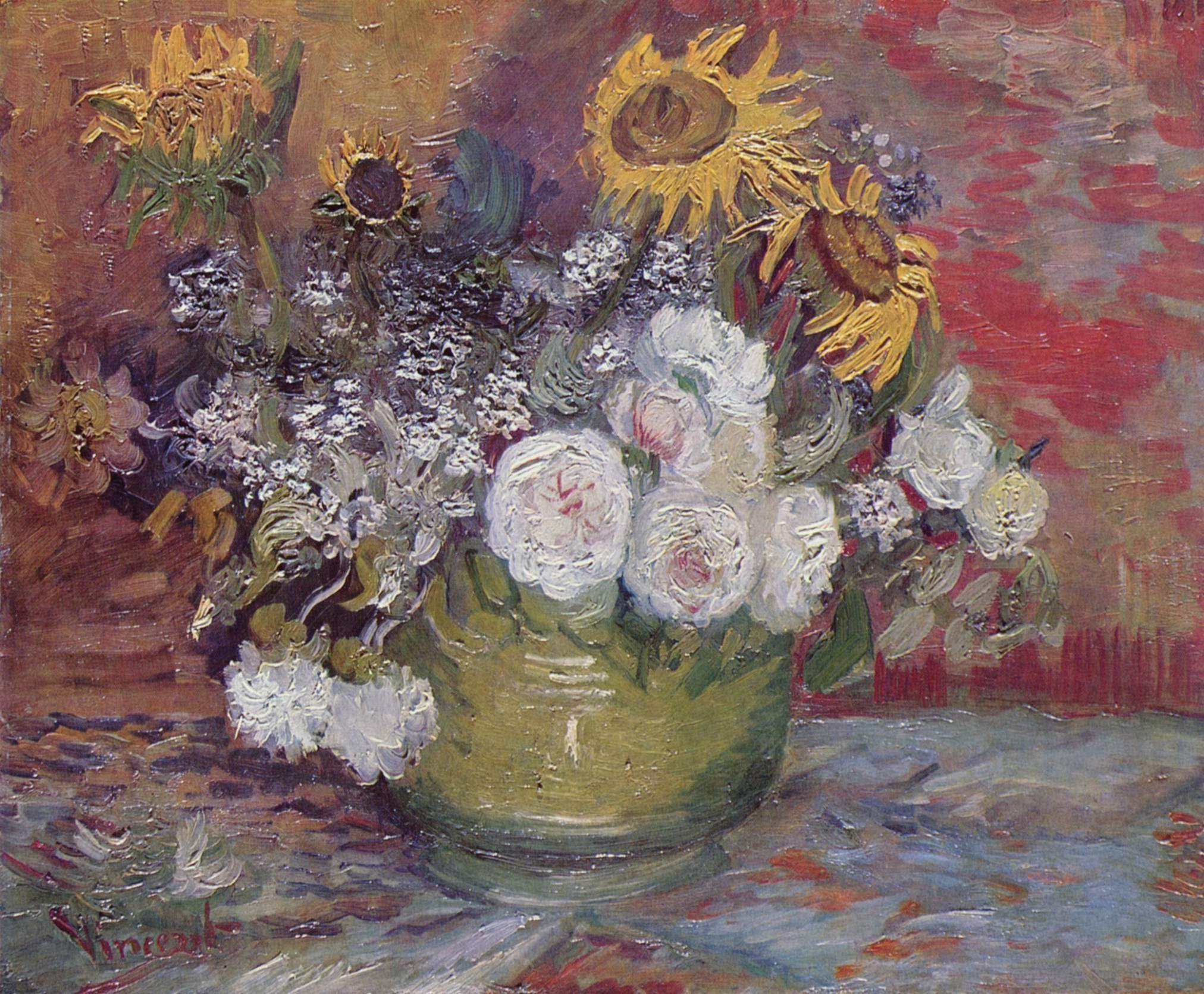
Roses and Sunflowers, F250, 1886, Oil on canvas, 50 × 61 cm, Kunsthalle Mannheim

== The Arles Sunflowers ==
In a letter to Theo dating from 21 or 22 August 1888, van Gogh wrote: "I'm painting with the gusto of a Marseillais eating bouillabaisse, which won't surprise you when it's a question of painting large sunflowers." At the time, he was working on three paintings simultaneously and intended to do more, as he explained to his brother: "in the hope of living in a studio of our own with Gauguin, I'd like to do a decoration for the studio. Nothing but large sunflowers".

Leaving aside the first two versions, all Arlesian Sunflowers are painted on size 30 canvases.

=== The initial versions, August 1888 ===
The versions of the paintings provided by van Gogh in his announcement of his sunflower series do not precisely match every detail supplied by him. The first version differs in size, is painted on a size 20 canvas—not on a size 15 canvas as indicated—and all the others differ in the number of flowers depicted from van Gogh's announcement. The second was evidently enlarged and the initial composition altered by insertion of the two flowers lying in the foreground, center and right. Neither the third nor the fourth shows the dozen or 14 flowers indicated by the artist, but more—fifteen or sixteen. These alterations are executed wet-in-wet and therefore considered genuine rework—even the more so as they are copied to the repetitions of January 1889; there is no longer a trace of later alterations, at least in this aspect.

The plexiglass in front and frame of the fourth version of the painting was attacked on 14 October 2022 by environmental activists from the Just Stop Oil campaign, who threw tomato soup at it, while it was on display at National Gallery in London, before gluing their hands to the wall. as the painting was covered with plexiglass, and it was unharmed with the exception of minor damage to the frame. The two activists were arrested and the painting was put back on display later that day. The two activists were found guilty of criminal damage in July 2024, and sentenced in September to 20 and 24 months in prison, respectively. As with all other environmentalists' museum actions around this time, none of the works were harmed.

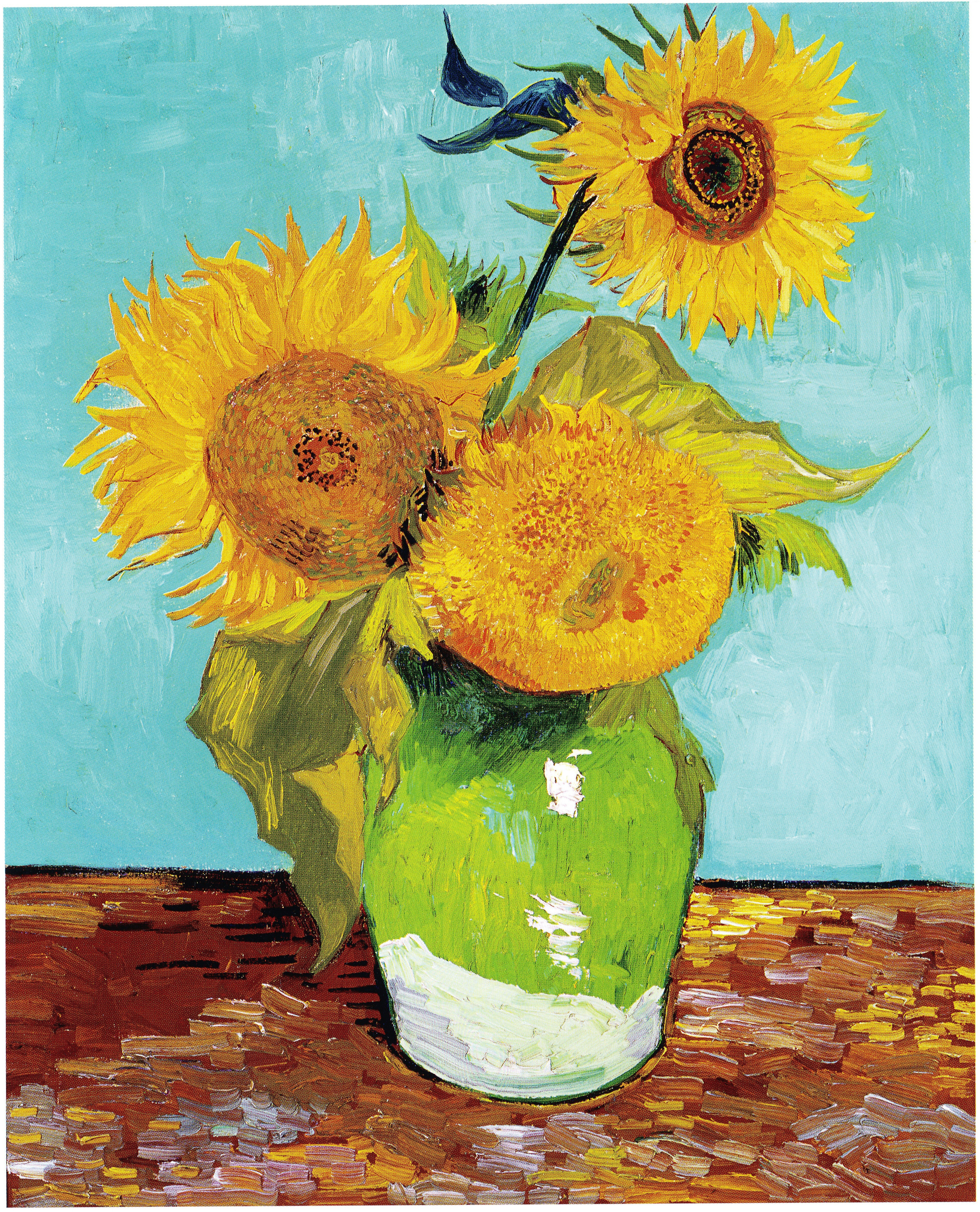
Three Sunflowers in a Vase (F453), first version: turquoise background
Oil on canvas, 73.5 × 60 cm
Private collection

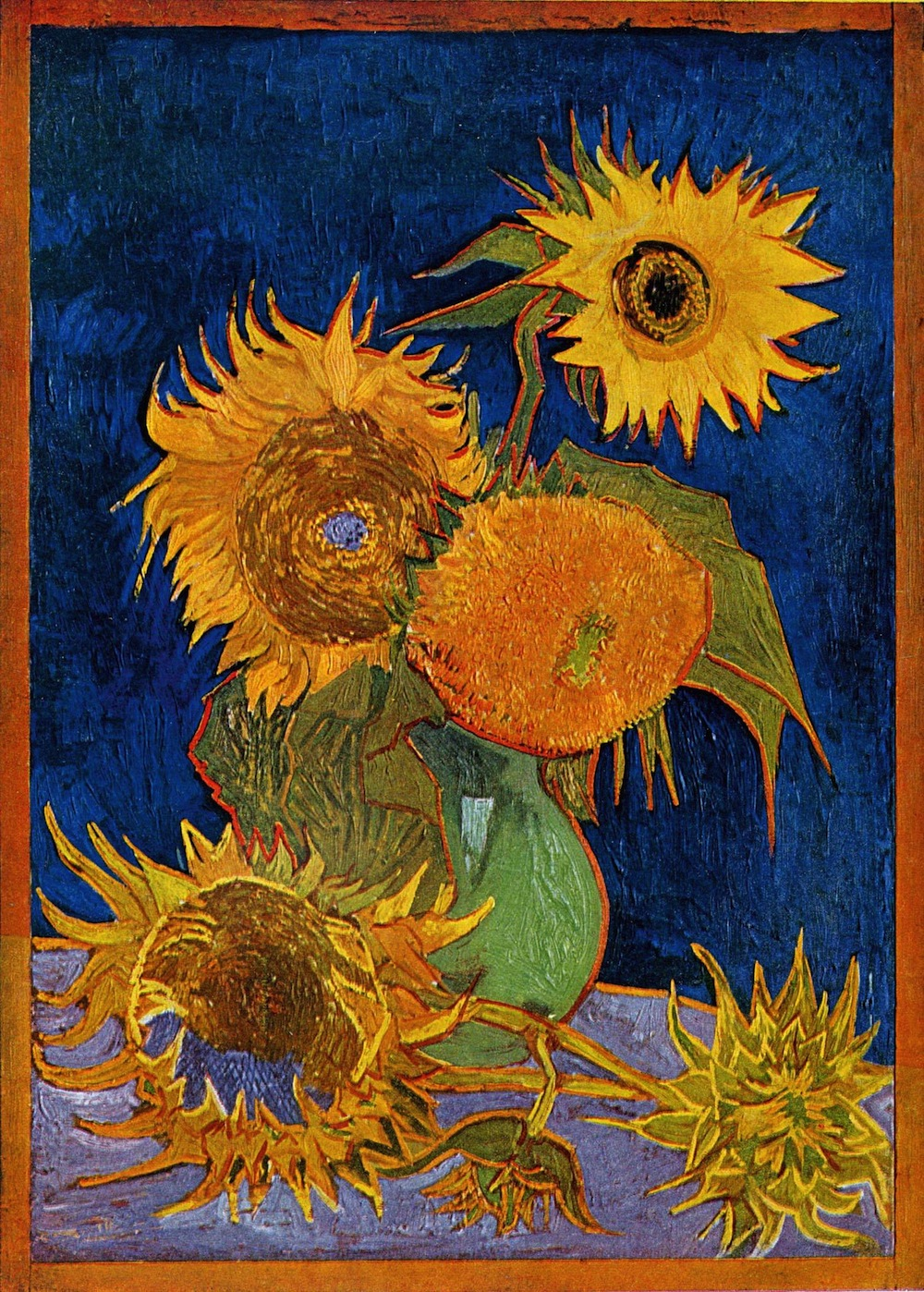
Still Life: Vase with Five Sunflowers (F459), second version: royal-blue background
Oil on canvas, 98 × 69 cm
Formerly private collection, Ashiya, Japan, destroyed by US air raid of World War II on 6 August 1945

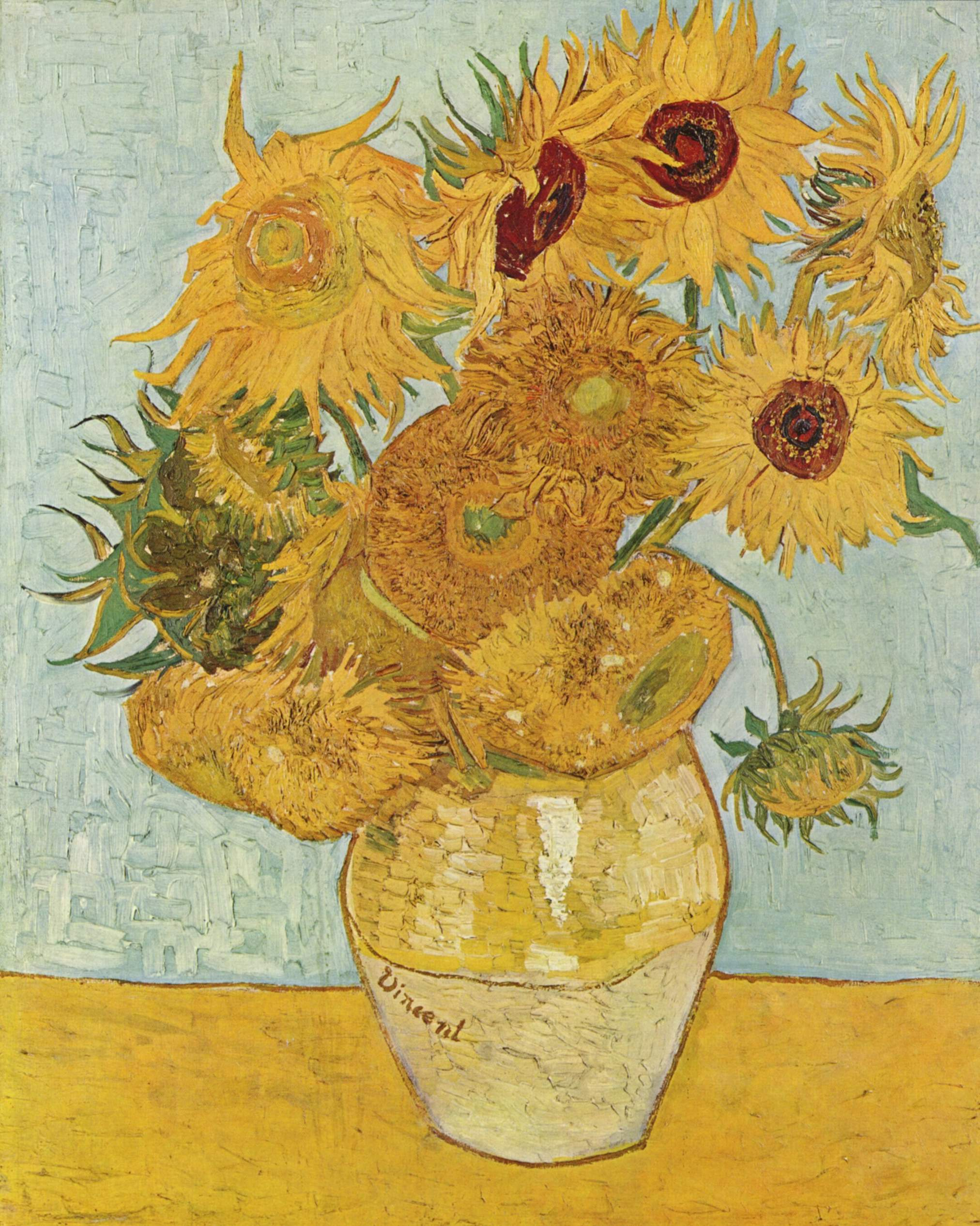
Still Life: Vase with Twelve Sunflowers (F456), third version: blue green background
Oil on canvas, 91 × 72 cm
Neue Pinakothek, Munich, Germany

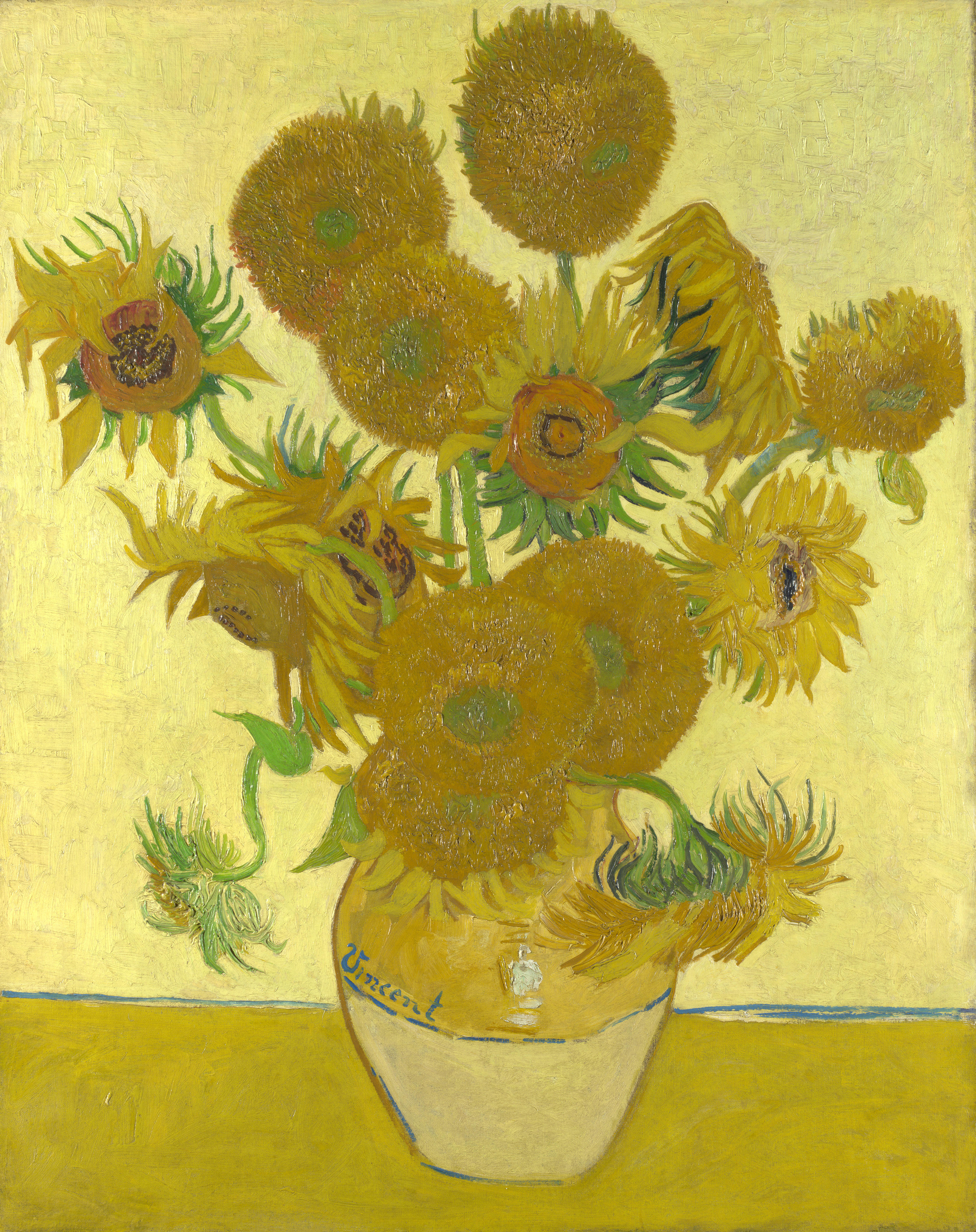
Still Life: Vase with Fifteen Sunflowers (F454), fourth version: yellow background
Oil on canvas, 92.1 × 73 cm
National Gallery, London, England

=== The Repetitions, January 1889 ===
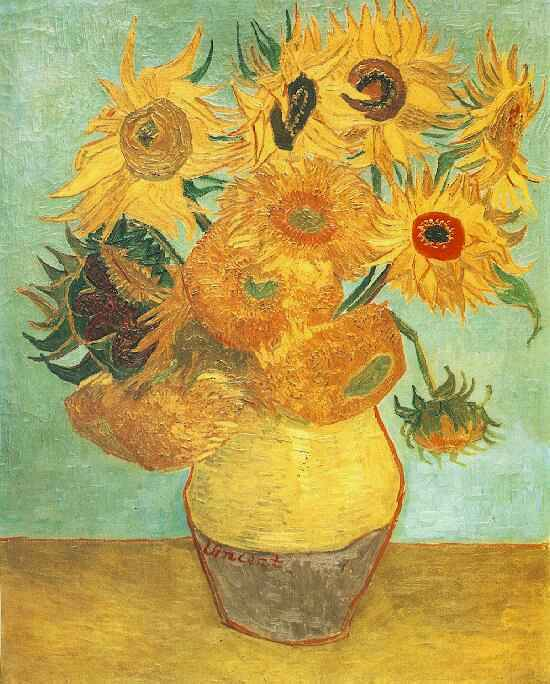
Still Life: Vase with Twelve Sunflowers (F455), repetition of the 3rd version
Oil on canvas, 92 × 72.5 cm
Philadelphia Museum of Art, Philadelphia, United States.

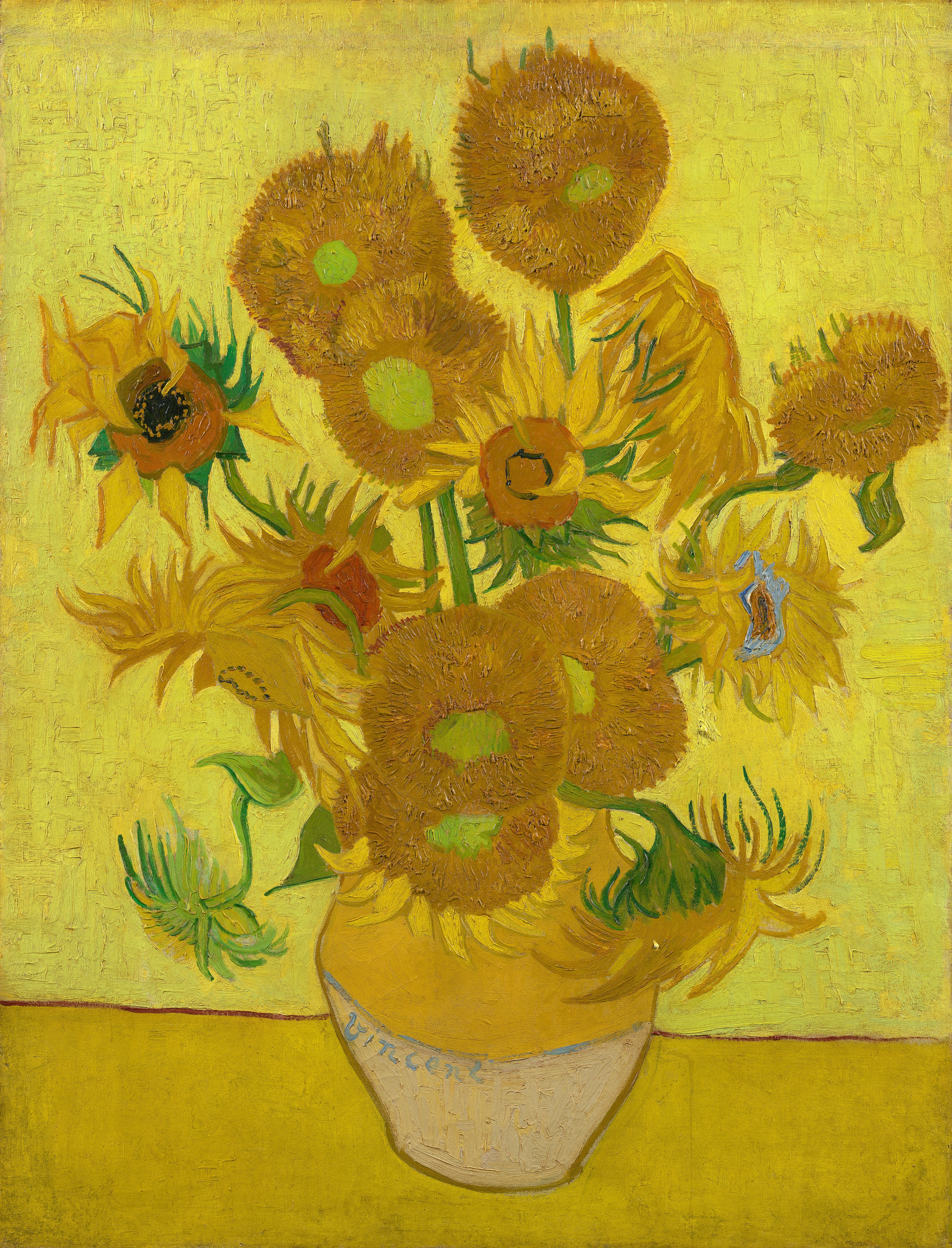
Still Life: Vase with Fifteen Sunflowers (F458), repetition of the 4th version (yellow background)
Oil on canvas, 95 × 73 cm
Van Gogh Museum, Amsterdam, Netherlands.

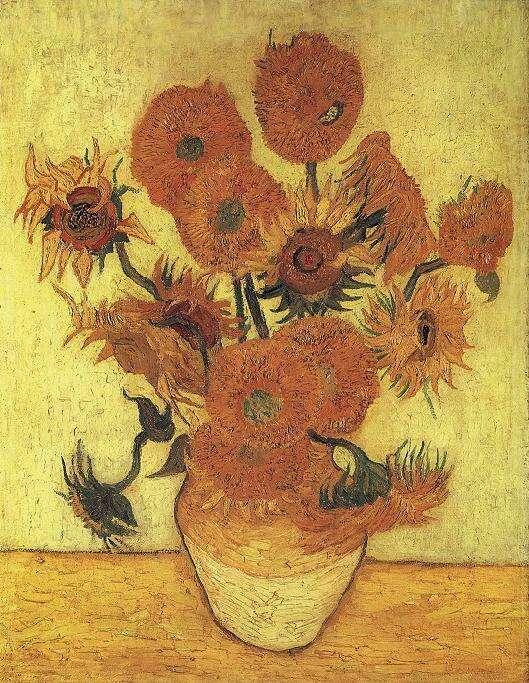
Still Life: Vase with Fifteen Sunflowers (F457), replica of the 4th version (yellow background)
Oil on canvas, 100 × 76 cm
Sompo Museum of Art, Tokyo, Japan.

Both repetitions of the 4th version are no longer in their original state. In the Amsterdam version, a strip of wood was added at the top—probably by van Gogh himself. The Tokyo version, however, was enlarged on all sides with strips of canvas, which were added at a later time—presumably by the first owner, Émile Schuffenecker. The series is perhaps van Gogh's best known and most widely reproduced. In the 2000s, debate arose regarding the authenticity of one of the paintings, and it has been suggested that this version may have been the work of Émile Schuffenecker or of Paul Gauguin. Most experts, however, conclude that the work is genuine.

=== The Berceuse-Triptych ===
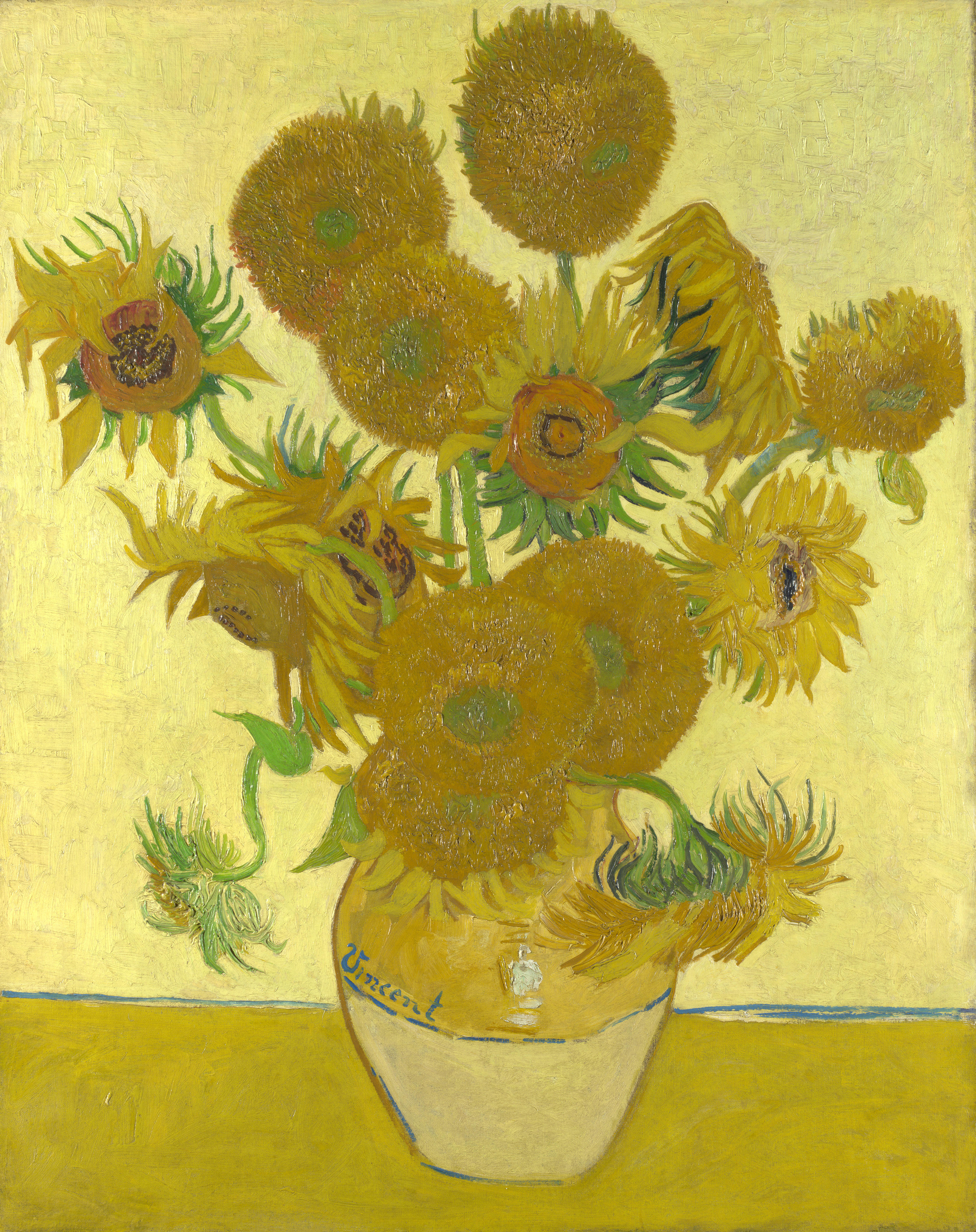
Sunflowers (London version)

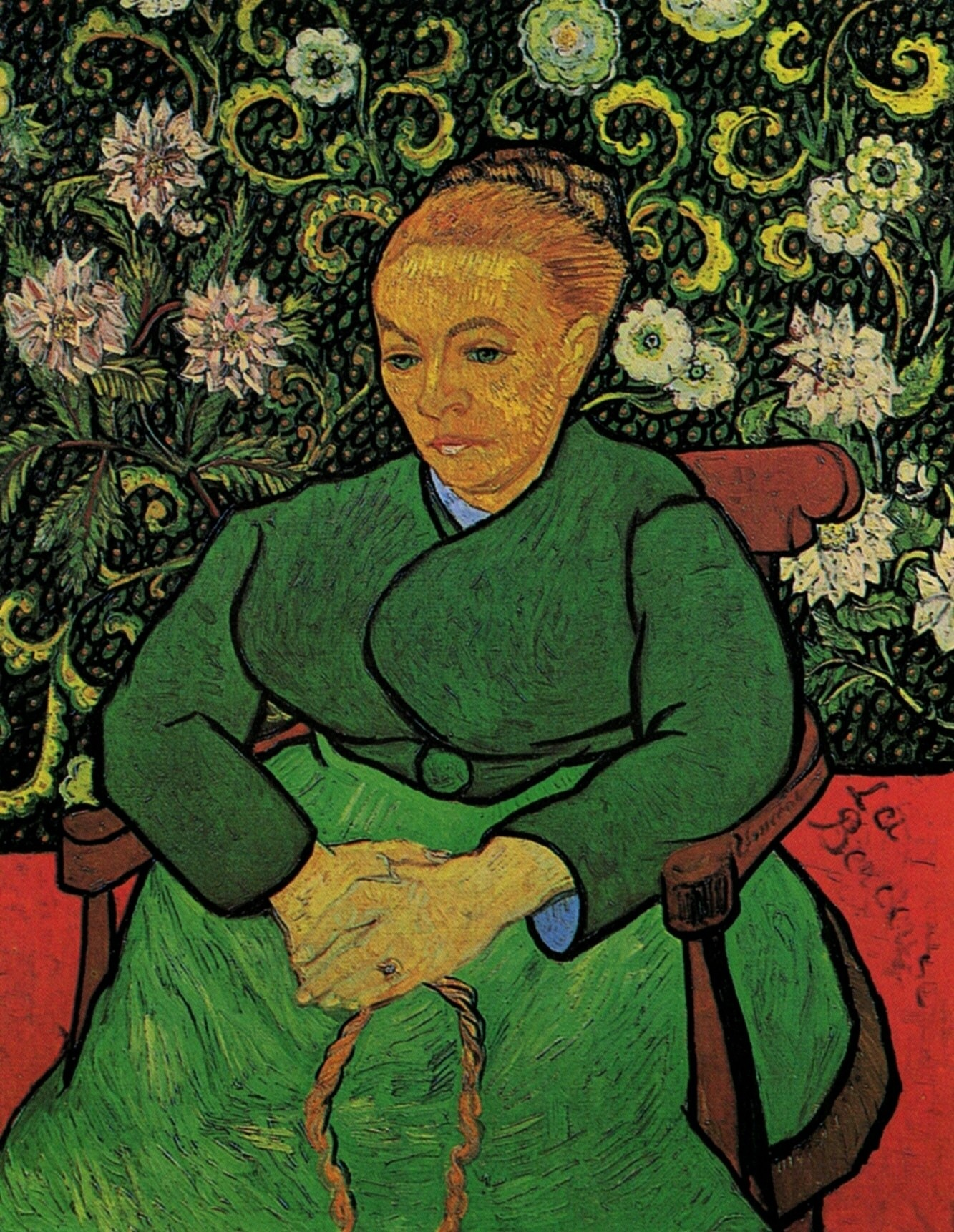
Berceuse (Otterlo version)

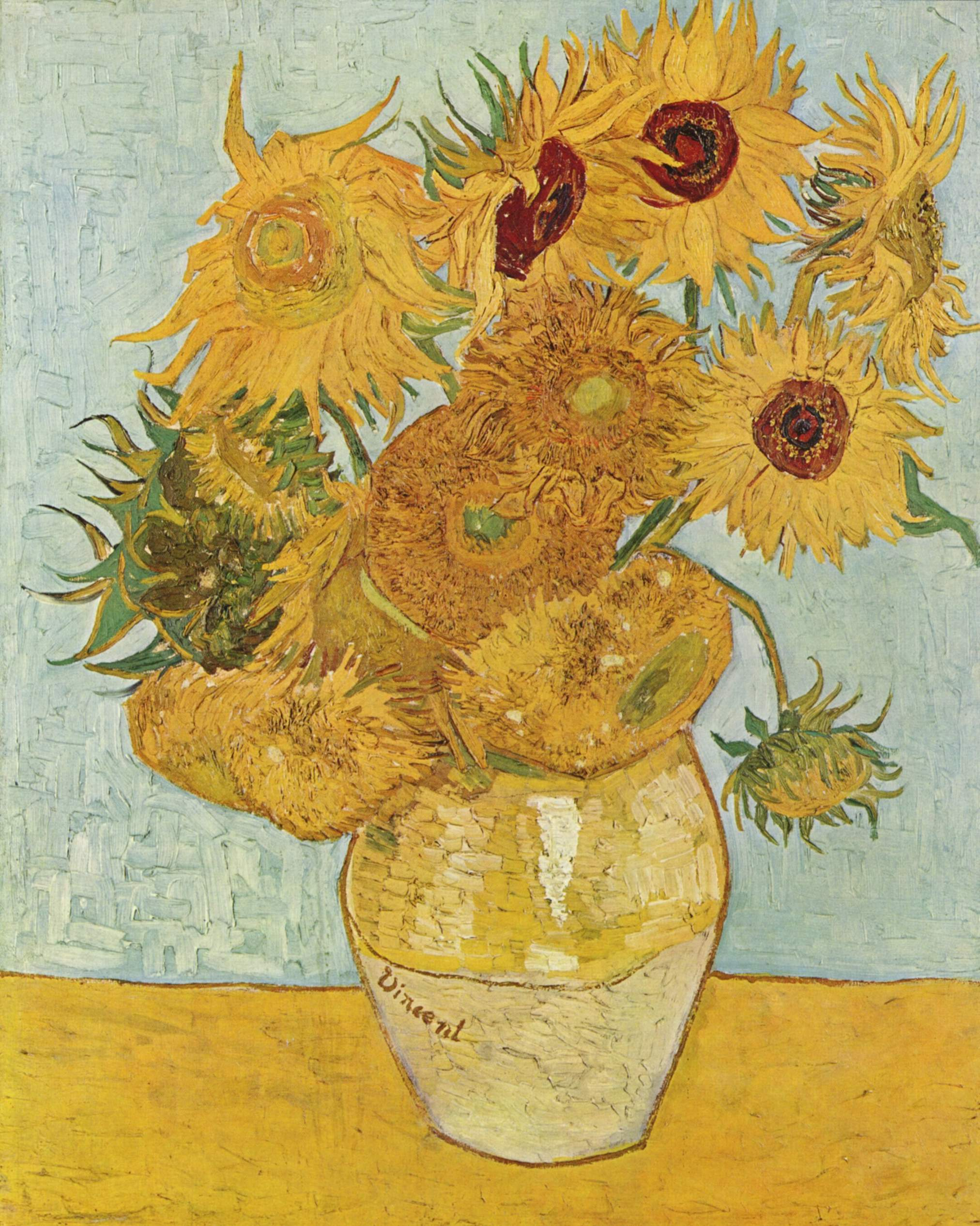
Sunflowers (Munich version)

For complete data see previous illustrations

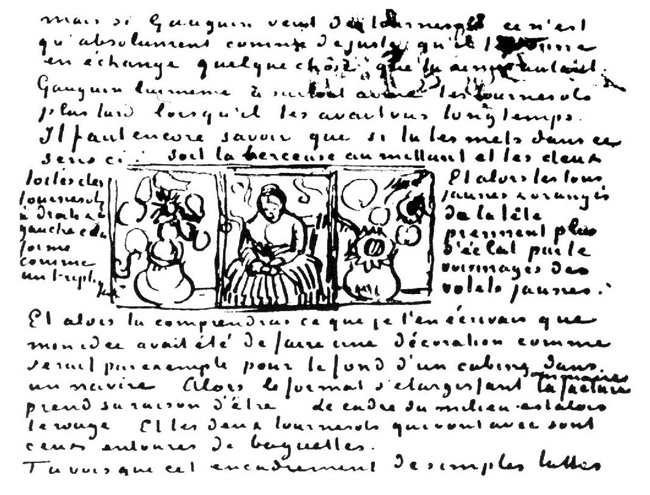
Sketch of the triptych in a letter to Theo

In January 1889, when Vincent had just finished the first repetitions of the Berceuse and the Sunflowers pendants, he told Theo: "I picture to myself these same canvases between those of the sunflowers, which would thus form torches or candelabra beside them, the same size, and so the whole would be composed of seven or nine canvases."

A definite hint for the arrangement of the triptych is supplied by van Gogh's sketch in a letter of July 1889.

Later that year, Vincent selected both versions for his display at Les XX, 1890.

The triptych was displayed as Vincent intended at the National Gallery in London in 2024, with the London and Philadelphia versions flanking the Boston Berceuse. The two Sunflowers paintings were again attacked by Just Stop Oil protestors.

== Sunflowers, friendship and gratitude ==
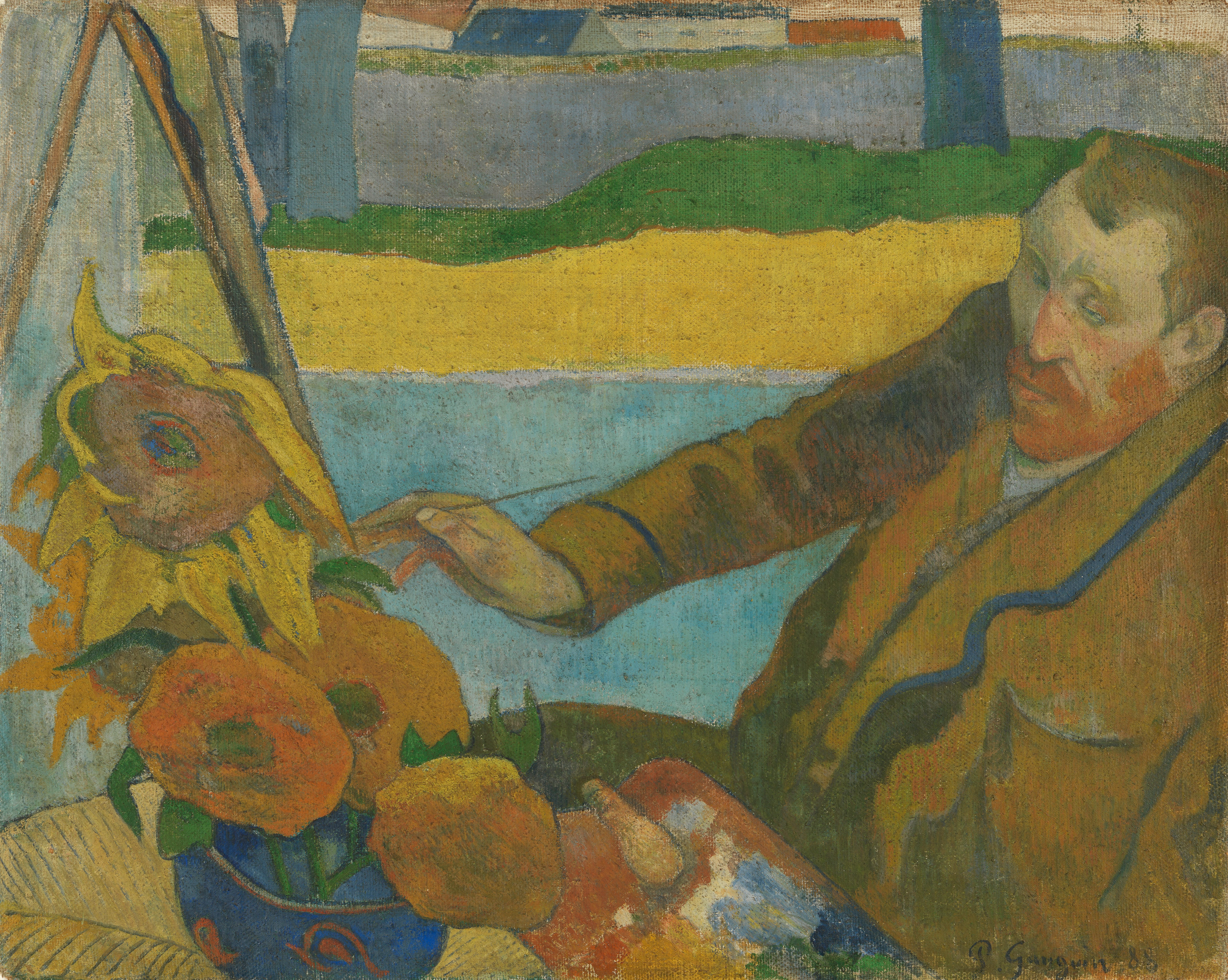
Paul Gauguin: The Painter of Sunflowers, 1888

Van Gogh began painting in late summer of 1888 and continued into the following year. One went to decorate his friend Paul Gauguin's bedroom. The paintings show sunflowers in all stages of life, from full bloom to withering. The paintings were considered innovative for their use of the yellow spectrum, partly because newly invented pigments made new colors possible.

In a letter to Theo, Vincent wrote:

"It's a type of painting that changes its aspect a little, which grows in richness the more you look at it. Besides, you know that Gauguin likes them extraordinarily. He said to me about them, among other things: 'that — ... that's... the flower'. You know that Jeannin has the peony, Quost has the hollyhock, but I have the sunflower, in a way."

== Subsequent history ==
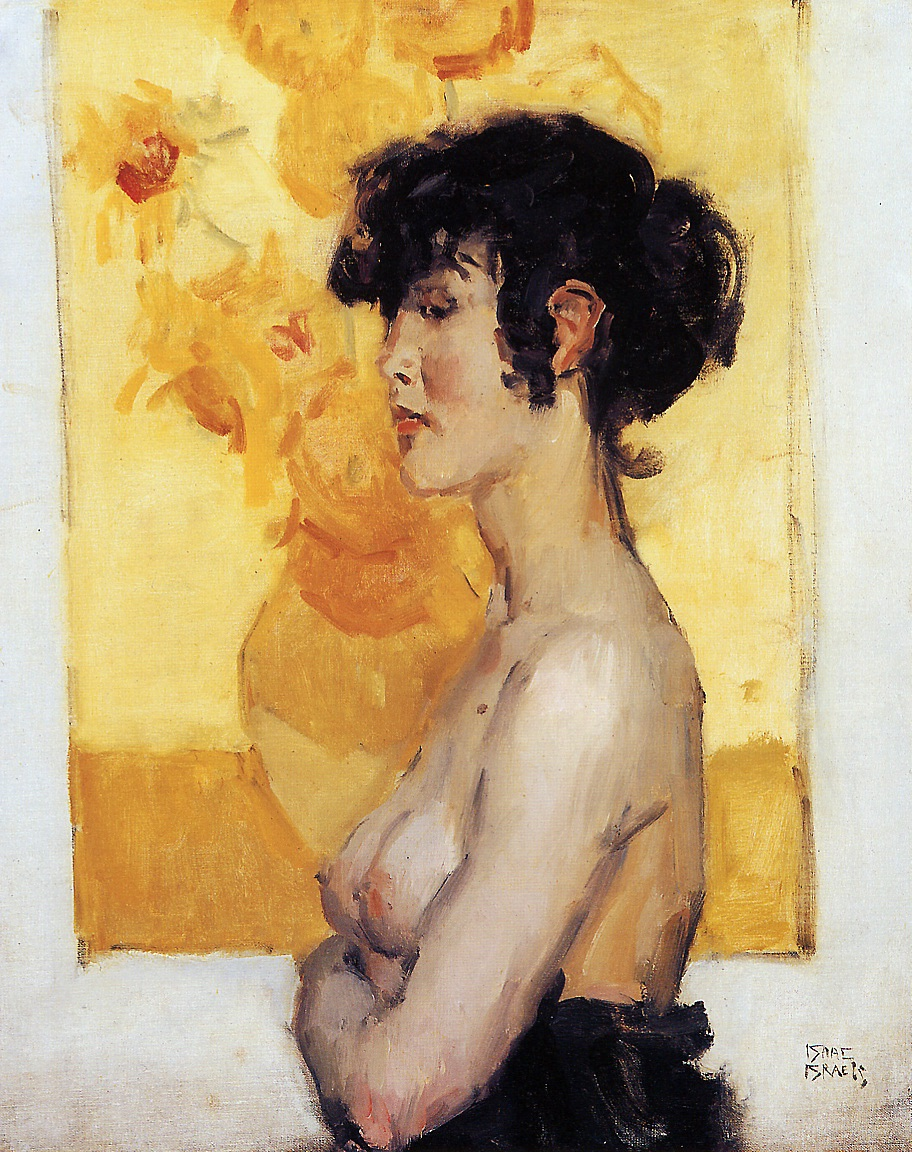
Isaac Israëls: Woman in front of van Gogh's Sunflowers, 1917. A close friend of Vincent Willem van Gogh, the artist's nephew, Israëls had a version of the Sunflowers on loan for a while.

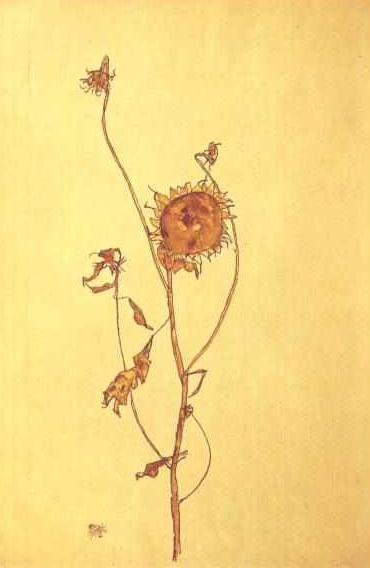
Dried Sunflowers by Egon Schiele.

On March 30, 1987, Japanese insurance magnate Yasuo Goto paid the equivalent of US$39,921,750 for van Gogh's Still Life: Vase with Fifteen Sunflowers at auction at Christie's London, at the time a record-setting amount for a work of art. The price was over three times the previous record of about $12 million paid for Andrea Mantegna's Adoration of the Magi in 1985. The record was broken a few months later with the purchase of another van Gogh, Irises, by Alan Bond for $53.9 million at Sotheby's, New York on November 11, 1987.

While it is uncertain whether Yasuo Goto bought the painting himself or on behalf of his company, the Yasuda Fire and Marine Insurance Company of Japan, the painting currently resides at the Seiji Togo Yasuda Memorial Museum of Modern Art in Tokyo. After the purchase, a controversy arose whether this is a genuine van Gogh or an Émile Schuffenecker forgery.

=== Provenances ===
Two Paris versions van Gogh exchanged with Gauguin in December 1887 or January 1888, were both sold to Ambroise Vollard: one in January 1895 and the other in April 1896. The first canvas resided for a short time with Félix Roux, but was reacquired by Vollard and sold to Degas, then from his estate to Rosenberg, then to Hahnloser and bequested to the Kunstmuseum Bern. The second was acquired by the Dutch collector Hoogendijk at the sale of his collection by Kann, who ceded the painting to Richard Bühler and then via Thannhauser to the Metropolitan Museum in New York.

Two of van Gogh's Sunflowers paintings never left the artist's estate: the study for one of the Paris versions (F377) and the repetition of fourth version (F458). Both are in the possession of the Vincent van Gogh Foundation, established 1962 by Vincent Willem van Gogh, the artist's nephew, and on permanent loan to the Van Gogh Museum, Amsterdam.

Five other versions are recorded in the van Gogh estate papers:

- the final Paris version (F.452) in the artist's estate was sold 1909 via C. M. van Gogh, The Hague (J. H. de Bois) to Kröller-Müller
- (F457) sold 1894 to Émile Schuffenecker. (Tokyo version).
- (F456) sold 1905 via Paul Cassirer to Hugo von Tschudi. (Munich version).
- (F459) sold 1908 C. M. van Gogh (J. H. de Bois), The Hague to Fritz Meyer-Fierz, Zürich (destroyed by U.S. air raid in Japan on 6 August 1945).
- (F454) sold 1924 via Ernest Brown & Phillips (The Leicester Galleries) to the Tate Gallery; since on permanent loan to the National Gallery, London. (London version).

Two Arles versions left the artist's estate unrecorded:

- (F453) (private collection). Sold 1891 to Octave Mirbeau, Paris, (via Tanguy, Paris) for £12 (about £1,300 in 2013). Sold 1996 to a private collector for an undisclosed sum.
- (F455) (Philadelphia version).

== See also ==
- List of works by Vincent van Gogh
