= Liberate Tate =

Liberate Tate is an art collective exploring the role of creative intervention in social change. The group aims to "free art from oil" with a primary focus on the art museum Tate ending its corporate sponsorship with BP. Liberate Tate has become internationally renowned for artworks about the relationship of public cultural institutions with oil companies. In 2016 Liberate Tate won its campaign with the announcement that BP sponsorship of Tate would come to an end in 2017.

== Origin ==
The collective was founded during a Tate workshop in January 2010 on art and activism. When Tate curators tried to censor the workshop from making interventions against Tate sponsors, even though none had been planned, the participants decided to continue their work together and set up Liberate Tate.

== Positions ==
Early in 2010 Liberate Tate issued an open invitation for artists, art lovers and other concerned members of the public to act to ensure that Tate ends its oil sponsorship. This led to a growing movement of artists and the public, including Tate members, raising their voices for a more ethical approach to the art museum's relationships and sources of funding.

== Artworks ==
Liberate Tate works include:

- "Dead in the water": a contribution to Tate Modern's 10th Birthday celebrations (May 2010) by hanging dead fish and birds from giant black helium balloons in the Turbine Hall.
- "License to spill": an oil spill at the Tate Summer Party celebrating 20 years of BP support (June 2010).
- "Crude/Sunflower": an installation artwork which saw over 30 members of the collective draw a giant sunflower in the Turbine Hall with black oil paint bursting from BP-branded tubes of paint (September 2010).
- "Human Cost": a performance in Tate Britain on the anniversary of the Deepwater Horizon explosion (April 2011) when a naked member of the group had an oil-like substance poured over them on the floor in the exhibition Single Form dedicated to the human body and part of BP British Art Displays.
- "Floe Piece": a 55 kg chunk of Arctic ice was taken from the Occupy London protest camp at St Paul's Cathedral across the Thames into the Tate Modern Turbine Hall (January 2012).
- "The Gift": a 16.5 metre, 1.5 tonne wind turbine blade installed in Tate Modern's Turbine Hall in an unofficial performance involving over 100 members of Liberate Tate (July 2012). The work was given to Tate and accepted as part of Tate's permanent collection.
- "All Rise": a performance where, on the third anniversary of the Deepwater Horizon oil spill, members of Liberate Tate live streamed themselves walking around Tate Modern whispering the transcript of BP's Deepwater Horizon trial in New Orleans.
- "Parts Per Million": a performance where 50 members of Liberate Tate count out loud the parts per million of carbon in the atmosphere for each decade of the BP Walk Through British Art.
- "TimePiece": a group of 75 members of Liberate Tate occupy the Tate Modern's Turbine Hall for 25 hours from High Tide on 13 June 2015 (11:53 am) until High Tide on 14 June 2015 (12:55 pm) covering the 152-metre sloping floor with charcoaled words on art, activism, fossil fuels and climate change.
- "Birthmark": a performance in Tate Britain on 28 November 2015 when 35 members of the group set up a tattoo parlour in the 1840s gallery of the 'BP Walk Through British Art' and tattoo each other with the numbers of the CO_{2} concentrations in the atmosphere in the year they were born.
- "Hidden Figures": an unrehearsed performance in 2014 where members of Liberate Tate and of the public were invited to hide themselves under a 8mx8m black cotton square symbolising Tate hiding the amount of money donated by BP.
- "5th Assessment": a performance in 2015 where members of Liberate Tate read aloud from the Fifth Assessment Synthesis Report by the Intergovernmental Panel on Climate Change inside Tate Britain.

== Publication ==
In December 2011 Liberate Tate, with arts and research organisation Platform and activist group Art Not Oil, released a publication, Not if but when: Culture Beyond Oil, on oil sponsorship of the arts.

== Audio tour ==
In March 2012 Liberate Tate, with Art Not Oil and Platform, released a sound artwork themed around the issue of BP sponsorship of Tate, "Tate à Tate". The site-specific work, an alternative to the official Tate Multimedia Guide and Tate to Tate tours, is for the three locations of Tate Britain, Tate Modern and the Tate Boat. The work is downloaded onto smartphone, iPod or MP3 player and played whilst walking around the Tate London galleries and while sitting on the boat journey along the Thames between the galleries. Artists collaborating with Liberate Tate on "Tate à Tate" were performance artist Mark McGowan (a.k.a. The Artist Taxi Driver), Jim Welton and Ansuman Biswas as well as composer Isa Suarez, comedian Mae Martin and journalist Phil England.

== Open Letter to Nicholas Serota ==
Liberate Tate enhanced performances with evidence of the voice of Tate members and visitors as the art collective argued Tate itself had appeared to not make any meaningful effort to assess their views. Given this, Liberate Tate gave stakeholders this opportunity with an Open Letter to Nicholas Serota in late 2011. Signed by over 8,000 people in just three weeks with a call on Tate to "disengage with BP given the damage being caused by the company to ecosystems, communities and the climate" this was handed to the Tate director at the Tate Members Council on 2 December 2011.
