= Michel Forst =

French politician

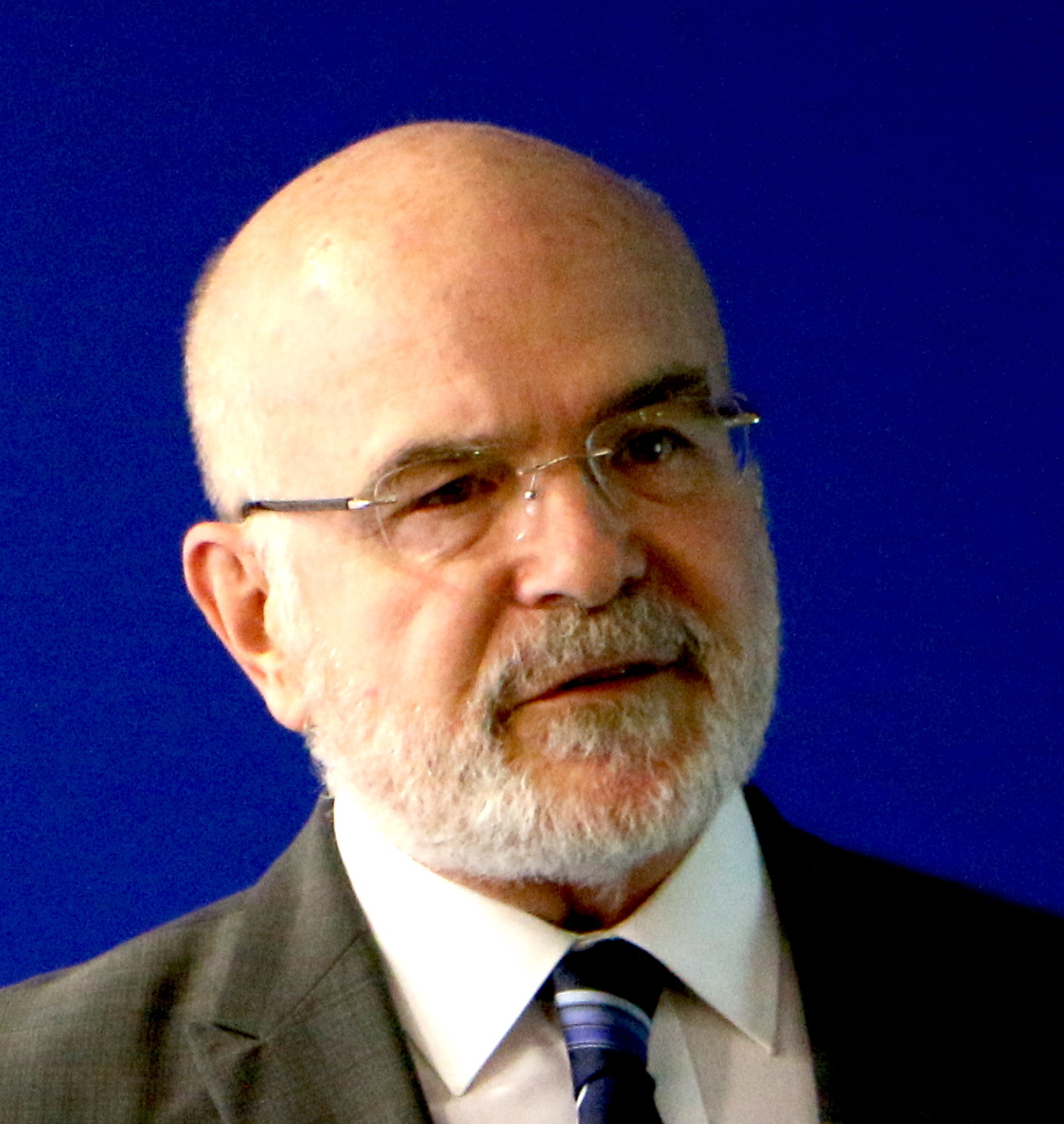
- Michel Forst, April 2016
- Occupation: Human rights defender
- Known for: Work in the defence of human rights
- Office: United Nations Special Rapporteur on the situation of human rights defenders
- Predecessor: -
- Successor: Mary Lawlor

Michel Forst is a French national actively involved in the defence of human rights. Former Secretary General of the French national human rights institution, he was the United Nations Special Rapporteur on the situation of human rights defenders from June 2014 to March 2020.

== Career ==
After graduating in language, theology and health studies, Forst started his career teaching German. He then worked as director of social healthcare institutions in the field of childcare, the elderly and those in extreme poverty.

He became the executive director of Amnesty International Frances in 1989, serving for ten years.

During this period, Forst was involved in many human rights projects, including the organisation of the first summit on human rights defenders in Paris in 1998. This event was held as the world celebrated the 50th anniversary of the Universal Declaration of Human Rights, with more than 350 human rights defenders attending the summit. The presence of Kofi Annan, then Secretary General of the United Nations, drew significant attention to the event. Jacques Chirac and Lionel Jospin, then French President and Prime Minister respectively, intervened during the closing session, reaffirming France's commitment to the protection of human rights defenders. On 9 December 1998, in New York, the United Nations General Assembly adopted the Declaration on the Right and Responsibility of Individuals, Groups and Organs of Society to Promote and Protect Universally Recognized Human Rights and Fundamental Freedoms, now commonly known as the Declaration on human rights defenders. That same year, human rights defenders were to receive the United Nations Prize in the Field of Human Rights.

Forst continued his career in nonprofit organizations. In 1999, he became the executive director of La Ligue contre le cancer. He remained in this position until 2001, when he joined the UNESCO in the Office of Social and Human Sciences. In 2003, he became Secretary General of La Cimade, a French organisation which brings legal aid to migrants and asylum seekers. He left in 2005, when he was appointed Secretary General of the French national human rights institution, the Commission nationale consultative des droits de l'homme. Forst is also a founding member of Front Line Defenders, an Irish non governmental organisation based in Dublin and a former board member of the International Service for Human Rights (ISHR).

In 2015, Forst was appointed Knight of the Legion of Honour by the French government.

=== United Nations ===
In 2008, Forst was appointed Independent Expert on the situation of human rights in Haiti, taking over from Louis Joinet. He resigned from this position in 2013, before the end of his mandate.

From 2012 to 2013, he acted as Chair of the Coordination Committee of Special Procedures of the Human Rights Council.

In June 2014, Forst became United Nations Special Rapporteur on the situation of human rights defenders. This mandate was created by the then United Nations Commission on Human Rights in 2000 to support the enforcement of the 1998 Declaration on human rights defenders. His main mission in this independent expert role was to identify and highlight the risks and threats faced by human rights defenders on the ground. He also made recommendations regarding better protection for human rights defenders. He undertook country visits and regularly reported to the Human Rights Council and to the United Nations General Assembly. He could also take up individual cases of concern. For example, in October 2015, he presented an allegation letter to the government of the United States concerning the criminal complaint filed against Edward Snowden, the revocation of his passport and the interference with his attempts to seek political asylum. The role involves cooperation with states, international structures and civil society organizations.

During his mandate on the situation of human rights defenders, Forst presented a number of thematic reports, highlighting the situation suffered by specific groups of defenders. He presented reports on the situation of environmental and land rights defenders, of defenders working in the field of business and human rights, on the situation of defenders working for the rights of people on the move. He also presented a report on good practices in the protection of human rights defenders.

Forst also presented a number of country reports after he officially visited those countries, including Australia, Azerbaijan, Burundi, Hungary and Mexico. During his visit to Mexico, Forst met with Carmen Aristegui a journalist he supported for her work against impunity and corruption.

In October 2015, Forst launched the website protecting-defenders.org, in order to share information about human rights defenders and his actions as Special Rapporteur, and to facilitate individual communication. This website complements the official website of the Office of the United Nations High Commissioner for Human Rights.

Forst sought to make his mandate more accessible to human rights defenders and to the general public. He notably undertook academic visits to many countries (Cambodia, Colombia, Costa Rica, DRC, Germany, Guatemala, Hong Kong, Italy, Israel and the OPT, Lebanon, Madagascar, Nicaragua, Norway, Panama, Peru, Russia, Spain, El Salvador and Venezuela, among others). He also developed his presence on social media - with a Twitter and a Facebook account and he published user-friendly versions of his official reports to the United Nations.

== Human Rights Defenders World Summit 2018 and Nobel Peace Prize ==
In 2018 and in the context of the 20th anniversary of the United Nations Declaration on Human Rights Defenders, Forst actively supported the idea of a second Human Rights Defenders World Summit and developed many activities to celebrate the declaration and its impact on support for civil society.

The Human Rights Defenders World Summit 2018 took place 29–31 October 2018, in Paris. The event was organised by eight human rights organisations, and more than 150 human rights defenders participated. It paid tribute to human rights defenders and provided them with a platform to define strategies.

To celebrate the 20th anniversary of the UN Declaration on Human Rights Defenders, Forst supported the nomination of human rights defenders for the 2018 Nobel Peace Prize. In an opinion column published in The Independent along with Susi Bascon from Peace Brigades International, he underscored the importance to support human rights defenders in a world where "freedom and democracy are on the defensive". They further explained: "There is no doubt that everyone on the nomination list for the prize has contributed significantly to building more peaceful societies. But we need to recognise that many are only able to do this because human rights defenders laid the foundations for action."

This nomination was presented the French Government. It was supported by Ann Clwyd MP, chair of the All-Party Parliamentary Human Rights Group at the UK Houses of Parliament, Peace Brigades International, more than 200 human rights organisations throughout the world and a number of scholars. A petition to endorse this nomination has also been created on change.org.

Forst's final substantial action in the role was a visit to Peru, and the presentation of a report on the situation for human rights defenders there.

His successor as Special Rapporteur, from May 2020, was Mary Lawlor.
