= Celia Walden =

British journalist, novelist, and critic (born 1975)

- Born: Celia Isobel Walden; 8 December 1975 (age 50); Paris, France
- Other name: Celia Morgan
- Education: Newnham College, Cambridge
- Occupations: Journalist, novelist, critic
- Spouse: Piers Morgan (m. 2010)
- Children: 1
- Father: George Walden

Celia Isobel Walden (born 8 December 1975) is a British journalist, novelist, and critic.

== Early life and education ==
Walden was born in Paris, France. Her father, George, became a Conservative MP and Minister for Higher Education under Margaret Thatcher's premiership. Walden's mother, Sarah, is an art historian and picture restorer, who has worked on old masters. Walden was educated at Westminster School, followed by Newnham College, Cambridge, where she read French and Italian. She grew up with two brothers.

== Career ==
Walden has worked as a waitress, but is best known as a feature writer and former gossip columnist. She was the last editor of The Daily Telegraph's now defunct diary, "Spy". She previously wrote for the Evening Standard and the Daily Mail. Her first novel, Harm's Way, was published in August 2008.

Walden wrote a column published in The Daily Telegraph on 24 March 2011, expressing her hatred of cyclists. The end of her article read "...and of course this lot are so confident on the roads that they will all be plugged into their iPods, calmly humming 'lalalalala' along to Sasha Distel, as that articulated lorry indicates left". The article was published in the same week that a cyclist in central London had been killed by a heavy goods vehicle (HGV) turning left into her path. Her column was condemned by the Cycling Intelligence website.

Walden's memoir from 2011 of her time spent with footballer George Best, Babysitting George, was vehemently criticised as "largely fictional" by his widow, Alex Best, who threatened legal action against the book's publisher, Bloomsbury Publishing. The Observer quoted Best's former mistress, Gina Devivo, describing the work as being by someone "with a very good imagination". Devivo added: "I am most angry for George, because he is not here to defend himself. It just didn't happen that way. George would be absolutely livid. He only ever spent a few days with Celia at most and had no rapport with her at all. I did tell Celia it was wrong before publication, and she told me she would put something in the front of the book saying it had all happened 'to the best of her memory'. In the end, though, she didn't, and she even thanked me for my 'continuing friendship', in the first pages, even though she hadn't seen me for eight years".

== Personal life ==
Walden began a relationship with fellow journalist Piers Morgan in January 2006. They married in a private ceremony in the Oxfordshire village of Swinbrook on 24 June 2010. Morgan announced in June 2011 that the couple was expecting a child, and on 25 November 2011, Walden gave birth to her first child, and her husband's fourth.
