= Social Change Lab =

UK non-profit research organisation

- Founded: 2021
- Founded at: London, England
- Type: Non-profit research organisation
- Purpose: Research into activist strategies.
- Location: London
- Region served: United Kingdom
- Key people: Sam Nadel, Director
- Website: www.socialchangelab.org

Social Change Lab is a non-profit research organisation based in the United Kingdom, founded in 2021. It conducts empirical research on the effectiveness of protest movements and social change campaigns, with a focus on the impact of activism and protest on public opinion and policy change.

== History ==
Social Change Lab was founded in 2021 by James Özden, a climate and animal rights activist. Özden has said he was motivated to found the organisation by his experience with Extinction Rebellion, where he felt there was insufficient evidence on which activist strategies were effective.

Its early research focused primarily on climate and animal advocacy movements. From 2025 onwards, the organisation expanded its work to include research on artificial intelligence safety and governance alongside its existing research on protest movements and social change campaigns.

Özden stepped down as director in 2023 and was succeeded by Mabli Jones. Sam Nadel joined the organisation as interim director in 2024 and was subsequently appointed permanent director.

Social Change Lab has received funding from a range of philanthropic foundations and grant-making organisations. Funders include the John Ellerman Foundation , Climate Emergency Fund and Changing Ideas. Publicly reported grants include three awards totalling £79,500 from the Joseph Rowntree Reform Trust and the Brian Mercer Trust between January 2025 and March 2026.

== Research ==
Social Change Lab conducts empirical research that examines the effectiveness of protest strategies within social movements. To date, its research has focused on climate change, animal advocacy and AI governance.

In 2022, Social Change Lab conducted research into public attitudes towards Just Stop Oil's programme of disruptive climate protests in the United Kingdom. The research concluded that Just Stop Oil's protests did not reduce public support for climate action and identified a 'positive radical flank effect' whereby the action increased support for more moderate environmental organisations.

Social Change Lab has published research on public attitudes toward animal rights issues, including factory farming, animal testing and disruptive protest tactics. The organisation's work has been discussed in academic literature, including a 2025 study published in Humanities and Social Sciences Communications.

== Reception ==
Social Change Lab's research on Just Stop Oil received coverage in The Guardian, BBC news, Deutsche Welle and Al Jazeera. The organisation's research has also received attention in the scientific press, with its findings on the effects of disruptive climate protest featured by Nature and has been published in the peer-reviewed journal Nature Sustainability. Social Change Lab's research on disruptive animal rights protest was featured by The Ecologist, which reported on the organisation's findings on the effects of Animal Rising's 2023 Grand National protest.

In 2025, Social Change Lab was profiled by InfluenceWatch, which describes it as a left-leaning research organisation focused on protest movements.

== Publications ==
Selected publications include:

- "Protest Movements: How Effective Are They?" (2022)
- "Making a Scene and Making Sense" (2025)
- "AI is on the March. Is the AI Safety Movement Ready?" (2025)
- "The short and long-term effects of disruptive animal rights protest" (Humanities and Social Sciences Communications, 2025)
- "The role of disruptive protests in the animal advocacy movement" (chapter in Animal and Vegan Advocacy, Routledge, 2026)
