= Climate Defiance =

US climate change direct action organization

- Formation: 2023
- Type: NGO
- Purpose: Direct action to demand climate change mitigation policies
- Founders: Michael Greenberg; Rylee Haught
- Website: climatedefiance.org

Climate Defiance is a climate movement organization in the United States which uses direct action protests to demand stronger climate change mitigation policies. The organization also occasionally engages in racial justice organizing.

The organization most often focuses on protesting Democratic Party officials and disrupting their events, with the stated goal of shifting the Overton window to make Democrats engage more strongly in climate policy, but claims to target 'climate criminals' regardless of their political affiliation, protesting bipartisan political events, as well as CEOs and corporate events.

Though their efforts have gained press attention and previously granted them meetings with Biden administration officials, their overall efficacy is disputed, with some claiming their actions are beneficial to the climate movement, and others claiming they either won't change policy or are damaging to the climate movement overall.

== Actions ==
On April 29, 2023, Climate Defiance disrupted the 2023 White House Correspondents Dinner, protesting the Biden administration's approval of the Willow Project and oil and gas leases in Mexico that ran counter to Joe Biden's campaign promise of ending oil drilling on federal lands. The protestors blocked the main driveway leading to the front entrance, as well as temporarily blocking a side entrance, but attendees later entered through an entrance being protected by D.C. police.

On December 8, 2023, they disrupted an event where Exxon CEO Darren Woods would receive an award, by going on stage with a banner saying "Eat Shit, Darren", while calling him a 'monster' and accusing him of greenwashing. Darren Woods had previously claimed that Exxon's statements have always been in line with climate science in a U.S. House of Representatives hearing, after an Exxon lobbyist had previously stated in a leaked video that Exxon had fought climate science.

On September 21, 2023, they repeatedly heckled Tommy Beaudreau five times over the same day, citing his signing off on the Willow Project as Deputy Secretary of the Interior. Beaudreau resigned from his position 15 days later.

On October 10, 2023, they disrupted an iMPACT Maryland event where Pete Buttigieg was speaking by getting on stage and chanting 'Stop Petro Pete' among other phrases, and holding a sign with the text "Pete: don't be a climate coward, Stop S.P.O.T. And GulfLink". S.P.O.T. is the Sea Port Oil Terminal, approved by the Biden administration, and GulfLink is a deepwater oil export project granted a license by the first Trump administration. Buttigieg left the stage, and returned shortly after when the protestors had left, approximately 5 minutes later.

On June 19, 2023, they disrupted a talk by U.S. Energy Secretary Jennifer Granholm, chanting 'No MVP, no LNG, Granholm you are killing me', in response to Granholm declaring a need for new pipelines, and previously supporting the Mountain Valley Pipeline and Alaska LNG Project. Protestors were quickly escorted out, and later claimed they were 'choked', 'slammed', and 'dragged' when being removed.

On May 12, 2023, they disrupted an event at George Washington University where Democratic Senator Amy Klobuchar was discussing her book The Joy of Politics. Multiple activists interrupted the talk at staggered intervals as part of the audience, and a larger group of activists later walked on stage holding a banner with the words 'End Fossil Fuels' and 'Amy: Which side are you on?', while chanting "Be a climate leader. Live your values". Klobuchar left the stage shortly after, as activists sung "Which side are you on, Amy? Which side are you on?", but returned after the group was removed approximately 7 minutes after the on-stage protest had begun. Multiple other activists continued interrupting the talk from the audience after she returned.

Climate Defiance has also disrupted the speaking events of several other Democratic officials, including Joe Manchin, Jerome Powell, and Ali Zaidi. After these actions, the group received a private meeting with White House adviser John Podesta on December 15, 2023.

Climate Defiance is supported by Margaret Klein Salamon's Climate Emergency Fund, which provides about half of Climate Defiance's budget.

== See also ==
- Extinction Rebellion
- The Climate Mobilization
- Margaret Klein Salamon
