= Diversity of tactics =

Social phenomenon

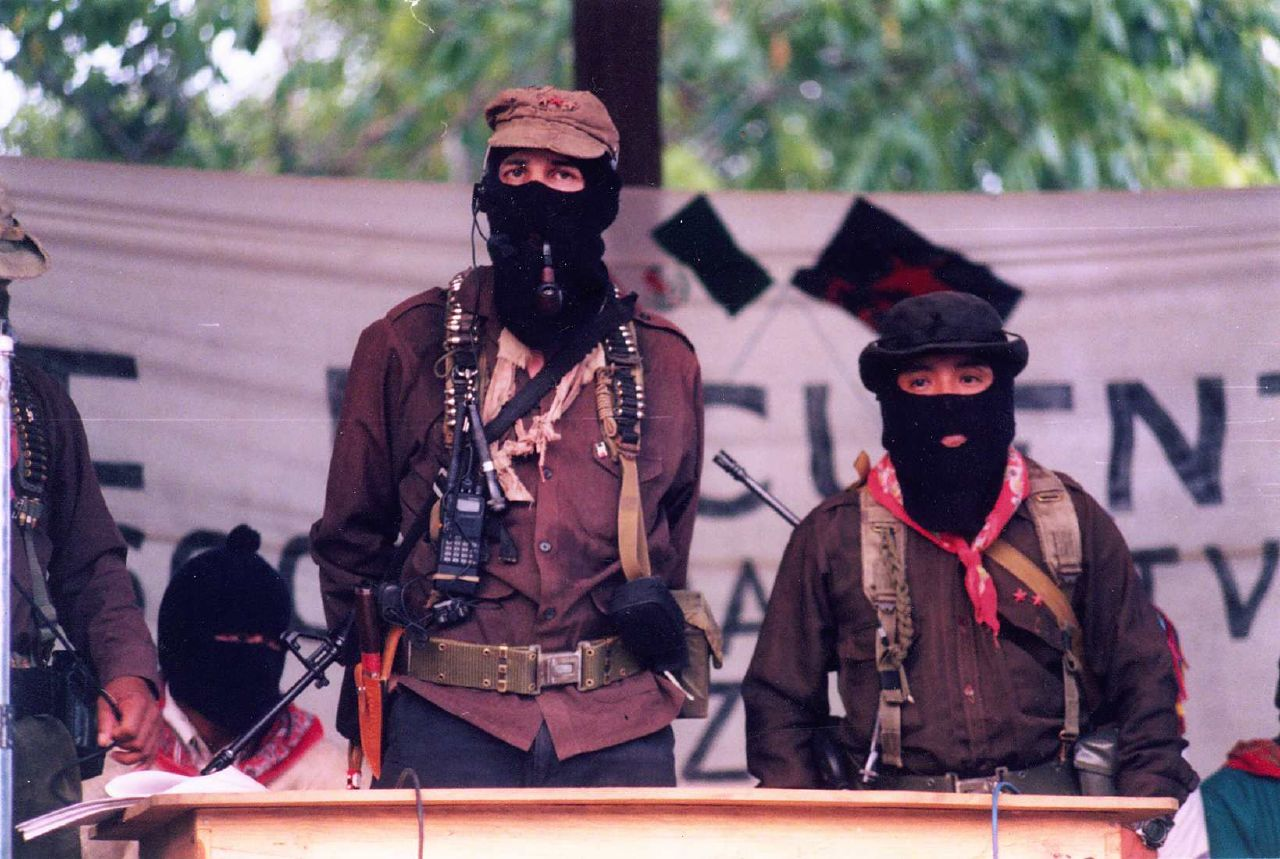
Subcomandante Marcos with members of the Zapatistas, who combine nonviolence and more militant forms of resistance

Diversity of tactics is a phenomenon wherein a social movement makes periodic use of force for disruptive or defensive purposes, stepping beyond the limits of nonviolent resistance, but also stopping short of total militarization. It also refers to the theory which asserts this to be the most effective strategy of civil disobedience for social change. Diversity of tactics may promote nonviolent tactics, or armed resistance, or a range of methods in between, depending on the level of repression the political movement is facing. It sometimes claims to advocate for "forms of resistance that maximize respect for life".

== Development of concept ==
The first clear articulation of diversity of tactics appears to have emerged from Malcolm X and other radical leaders in the Civil Rights Movement of the early 1960s. Shortly after Malcolm announced his departure from the Nation of Islam, he gave a speech entitled "The Black Revolution" where he promoted solidarity between those who practiced armed resistance against racism, and those who practiced nonviolence. He stated:

Our people have made the mistake of confusing the methods with the objectives. As long as we agree on objectives, we should never fall out with each other just because we believe in different methods or tactics or strategy to reach a common goal.

In March 1964, Gloria Richardson, leader of the Cambridge Maryland chapter of the Student Nonviolent Coordinating Committee (SNCC), took Malcolm X up on his offer to join forces with civil rights organizations. Richardson (who'd recently been honored on stage at the March on Washington) told The Baltimore Afro-American that "Malcolm is being very practical...The federal government has moved into conflict situations only when matters approach the level of insurrection. Self-defense may force Washington to intervene sooner."

In the same year, Howard Zinn (then on SNCC's Board of Advisers) published his essay "The Limits of Nonviolence," in the influential civil rights journal Freedomways. In the article, the historian concluded that nonviolent direct action would not be sufficient to break Jim Crow in the South. In his 1965 book, SNCC: The New Abolitionists, Zinn explained the philosophy that dominated the movement:

The members of SNCC—and indeed the whole civil rights movement—have faced in action that dilemma which confounds man in society: that he cannot always have both peace and justice. To insist on perfect tranquility with an absolute rejection of violence may mean surrendering the right to change an unjust social order. On the other hand, to seek justice at any cost may result in bloodshed so great that its evil overshadows everything else and splatters the goal beyond recognition. The problem is to weigh carefully the alternatives, so as to achieve the maximum of social progress with a minimum of pain. Society has been guilty of much quick and careless weighing in the past...on the other hand, it has permitted the most monstrous injustices which it might have eliminated with a bit of trouble.

=== Zinn's Disobedience and Democracy ===
In 1968, Zinn elaborated further on tactical diversity with his book Disobedience and Democracy: Nine Fallacies on Law and Order. The text was published in response to liberal Supreme Court Justice Abe Fortas, who'd recently written (in his book Concerning Dissent and Civil Disobedience) that he supported Gandhian forms of direct action, but not tactics that involved resisting arrest; Fortas also rejected campaigns involving the strategic violation of normally just laws, or the destruction of another party's property, or the injury to an oppressive party, including in direct self-defense (All of these tactics were becoming widespread in the Civil Rights Movement, Black Power movement and in the campaign against the Vietnam War).

Zinn produced an extended rebuttal to Fortas’ position; Regarding resisting arrest and judgment, Zinn countered that Gandhi had accepted the bad influence of Plato, who in his Crito dialogue, portrayed Socrates as cheerfully accepting his death sentence on the grounds that the citizen is obligated to abide by the final decision of the government, which is like a master to the people. Zinn points out that these are "the arguments of the Legalist, of the statist, not the libertarian," and notes that Plato disdained democracy. In the face of Plato's concern that sustained defiance of the law could topple the foundations of government, Zinn argues: "When unjust decisions become the rule, then the government and its officials should be toppled."

On the breaking of normally just laws and conventions for the purpose of protest, Zinn notes that some of society's worst problems—"like hunger, or poor housing, or lack of medical care"—are not the result of discrete laws, but of system-wide conditions; therefore targets cannot always be precise: "Our most deep-rooted troubles are not represented by specific laws, but are so woven into the American society that the only way to get at them is to attack the fabric at any vulnerable point."

Zinn rejects the liberal's "easy and righteous dismissal of violence," noting that Henry Thoreau, the popularizer of the term civil disobedience, approved of the armed insurrection of John Brown. Zinn acknowledges that "nonviolence is more desirable than violence as a means" but also posits that:

...in the inevitable tension accompanying the transition from a violent world to a nonviolent one, the choice of means will almost never be pure, and will involve such complexities that the simple distinction between violence and nonviolence does not suffice as a guide...the very acts with which we seek to do good cannot escape the imperfections of the world we are trying to change.

In particular, Zinn rejects moralizing over property destruction as historically ignorant and ethically shortsighted. He contends that in response to the massive violence of the state, the smashing of windows is a mercifully restrained disruption:

The degree of disorder in civil disobedience should not be weighed against a false ‘peace’ presumed to exist in the status quo, but against the real disorder and violence that are part of daily life, overtly expressed internationally in wars, but hidden locally under that facade of ‘order’ which obscures the injustice of contemporary society.

Zinn then addresses the claim that violence does irreparable harm to a movement's cause, countering that history repeatedly shows both the limitations of nonviolence and the efficacy of combative means: "Not until Negro demonstrations resulted in violence did the national government begin to work seriously on civil rights," the historian notes, using the Birmingham riot of 1963 as an example. Peaceful methods "were enough to raise the issue, but not to resolve it."

At the same time, Zinn proposes "a moral code on violence in civil disobedience," which would "consider whether the disorder or violence is controlled or indiscriminate..." This would engender a partially violent, yet predominantly non-lethal insurrection, which would be preferable to the alternative of a fully militarized, bloody civil war. Ultimately, Zinn comes down squarely for diversity of tactics:

Each situation in the world is unique and requires unique combinations of tactics...all the vast range of possible tactics beyond strict nonviolence.

Disobedience and Democracy sold over 70,000 copies (making it Zinn's most popular book prior to A People's History of the United States) and served as "the theoretical buttress to the many acts of civil disobedience committed during those years of the war in Vietnam."

=== Debate around WTO shutdown of 1999 ===
In the years after the end of the Vietnam War, protest in the US came to assume more orderly forms, and was increasingly dominated by the middle-class. When the anti-nuclear power movement made progress after the partial meltdown of Three Mile Island, a rigorously nonviolent strategy—promoted by Bill Moyer and the Movement for a New Society, and embodied in the Clamshell Alliance—was often credited for the advance, and these methods came to dominate the social justice community. This corresponded with the rise of a highly effective police strategy of crowd control called "negotiated management." Many social scientists have noted the "institutionalization of movements" in this period.

These currents largely constrained disruptive protest until the 1999 demonstrations against the World Trade Organization. In an unprecedented success for post-Vietnam era civil disobedience, the WTO Ministerial Conference opening ceremonies were shut down completely, host city Seattle declared a state of emergency for nearly a week, multilateral trade negotiations between the wealthy and developing nations collapsed, and all of this was done without fatalities. This occurred in the midst of mass rioting which had been set off by militant anarchists (some of them in a black bloc formation), nonviolent civil disobedience organized by various NGOs (including Public Citizen and Global Exchange) and the Seattle Direct Action Network (DAN), and a mass permitted march organized by the AFL-CIO.

In the lead up to the shutdown, local group Seattle Anarchist Response (SAR) had circulated Ward Churchill's text Pacifism as Pathology freely among protesters. SAR actively promoted diversity of tactics among the rank-and-file of DAN and criticized NGO hegemony of the protests. They often found an enthusiastic response. One DAN organizer told The Seattle Weekly that "I'm emerging with a less strong opinion of what is right and wrong, and using different tactics so long as they're used well. That's not where I was a year ago." The call for the Seattle protest had originally come from Peoples Global Action (a network co-founded by the Zapatistas) which supported diversity of tactics and a highly flexible definition of nonviolence.

In the aftermath of the shutdown, various NGO spokespeople associated with Seattle DAN claimed that the riotous aspect of the WTO protests was counterproductive and undemocratic. They also asserted that it was only an insignificantly small group from Eugene, Oregon that engaged in property destruction. Medea Benjamin told The New York Times that "These anarchists should have been arrested," while Lori Wallach of Public Citizen stated that she had instructed Teamsters to turn black bloc participants over to the police.

In response, five academics including Christian Parenti, Robin Hahnel, and Ward Churchill signed an open letter denouncing the "tide of reaction" that the NGO sector was organizing against militant protesters. "Those who belittle and distance themselves from the actions of ‘the Anarchists from Eugene’ have either ignored or simply did not realize the level of contributions anarchists—black-clad and otherwise—made towards bringing the November 30th Festival of Resistance into reality." They also asserted that the established left, by advocating violence against certain protesters in order to protect corporate property, was fostering "an uncritical acceptance of the dominant value system of American consumer society: private property has a higher value than life."

In her own response to the controversy, Barbara Ehrenreich decried the NGO leaders as "hypocrites," and wrote that nonviolent activists ought to be "treating the young rock-throwers like sisters and brothers in the struggle." She also criticized the dominant nonviolent paradigm as "absurdly ritualized," as well as elitist for presuming to reject any protester who hadn't gone through nonviolence training "for hours or even days." Ehrenreich concluded: "The people at Direct Action Network, Global Exchange, and other groups were smart enough to comprehend the workings of the WTO, IMF, and World Bank. Now it's time for them to figure out how large numbers of people can protest the international capitalist cabal without getting clobbered—or trashed by their fellow demonstrators—in the process."

The solution to Ehrenreich's impasse was the growing acceptance of diversity of tactics in the anti-globalization movement. The first major indication was in April 2000, when the NGO coalition involved in demonstrations against the World Bank in Washington DC resisted calls by the media to denounce protesters who did not practice strict nonviolence. Spokesperson Nadine Bloch told the press that: "What there was among the protesters [in Seattle] was alternative tactics. Property destruction is something done to things, not to people. I don't think that property destruction in the context of [this Washington protest] would be something very constructive. But when we look at what happened in Seattle, we have to say that all of that contributed to the media coverage we got, including those who you might say pushed the envelope."

In the lead up to the protests for the 2001 Free Trade Area of the Americas (FTAA) summit in Quebec City, a major direct action organization known as SalAMI suffered a mass defection due to its intolerance of diversity of tactics. Numerous participants (including Jaggi Singh) criticized SalAMI for its "dogmatism on nonviolence" as well as perceived hierarchies within the organization. Out of this schism emerged le Convergence des luttes Anti-Capitalistes (CLAC). CLAC's "Basis of Unity" stated: "Respecting a diversity of tactics, the CLAC supports the use of a variety of creative initiatives, ranging from popular education to direct action."

The anti-FTAA demonstrations were massive, involving sixty thousand people at its peak, and received largely positive media coverage, even as they included widespread clashes with police and destruction of government property. Cindy Milstein observed that CLACs success in Quebec City sprang from using a broad repertoire that encompassed community organizing, international outreach and forceful confrontation. CLAC continue to be active in Quebec to this day, and composed part of the radical flank of the successful tuition-freeze protests of 2012.

Peoples Global Action solidified its support for diversity of tactics at this time by dropping the word "non-violent" from its hallmark on civil disobedience. They explained that:

The problem with the old formulation was first that the word "non-violence" has very different meanings in India (where it means respect for life) and in the West (where it means also respect for private property). This basic misunderstanding has proved quite impossible to correct in media—or indeed in the movement itself. The North American movement felt that the term could be understood to not allow for a diversity of tactics or even contribute to the criminalisation of part of the movement. The Latin American organisations had also objected to the term in their regional conference, saying that a "call to civil disobedience " was clear enough, whereas " non-violence " seemed to imply a rejection of huge parts of the history of resistance of these peoples and was as such badly taken by large parts of the movement...

In fact, there was always an understanding in PGA that non-violence has to be understood as a guiding principle or ideal which must always be understood relative to the particular political and cultural situation. Actions which are perfectly legitimate in one context can be unnecessarily violent (contributing to brutalise social relations) in another. And vice versa. Precisely to make this clear, the Zapatista army (EZLN) was invited to be among the first generation of convenors. The wording finally found seemed to respect this fundamental stance, since it explicitly advocates MAXIMISING respect for life.

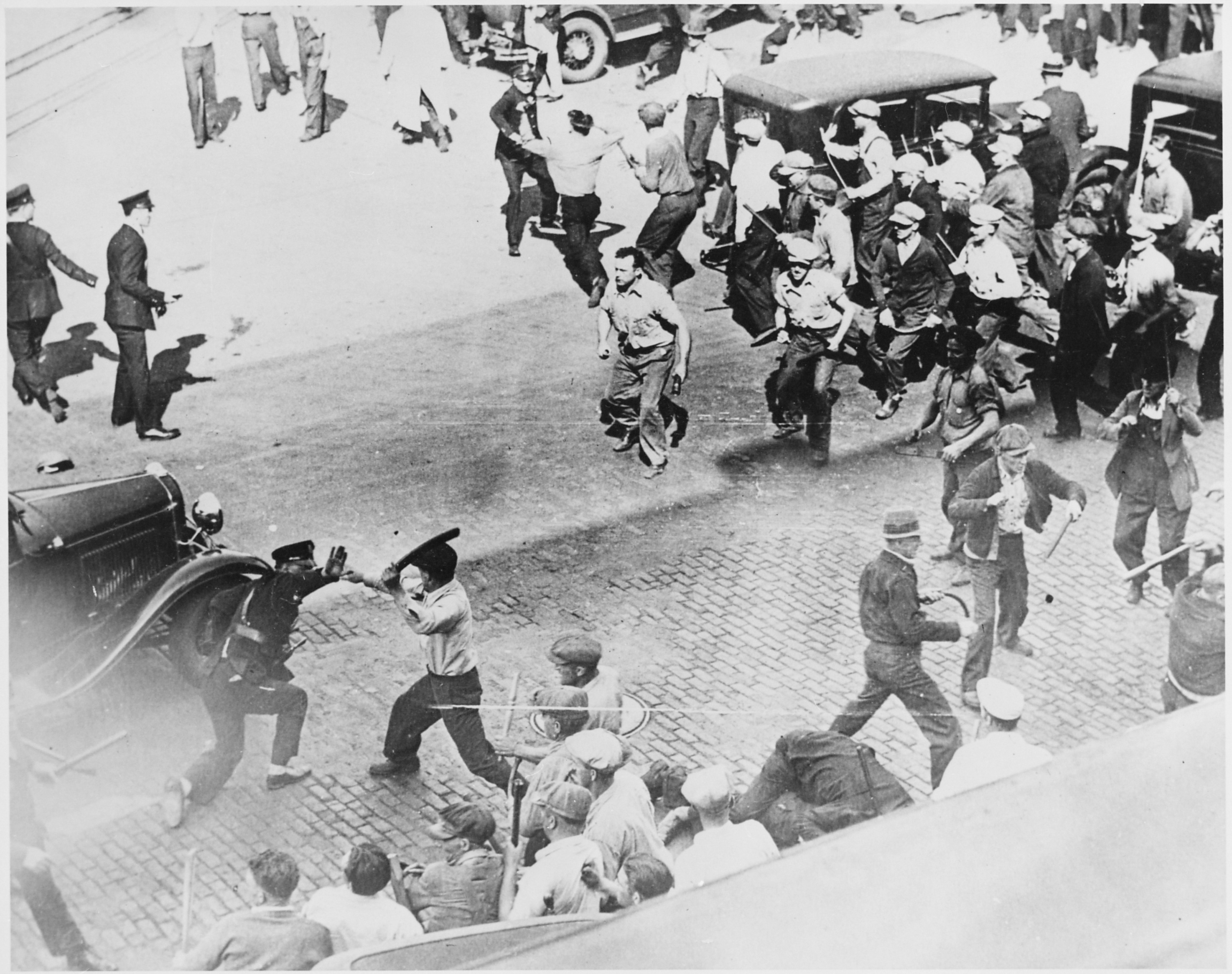
Teamsters Local 574 battle police in the Minneapolis General Strike of 1934

=== Recent scholarship ===
In recent years, numerous academics have addressed diversity of tactics. Eminent sociologist Francis Fox Piven, in analyzing strategies of disruptive protest, wrote that:

Protest movements may or may not engage in violence against property or persons. Students of American social movements have been very timid about this issue. They tend to ignore episodes of violence that do occur, excluding them by fiat from their definition of social movements. I suspect that they are influenced by their sympathy for...the much-proclaimed "nonviolence" of the civil rights movement... Just as nonviolence can be strategic, so can violence be used strategically, and often defensively to permit the disruptive action, the withdrawal of cooperation, to continue.

Piven's findings affirm that of other social movement scholars, such as William Gamson and Pamela Oliver. Oliver wrote that, "Today's young people are generally taught a celebratory history of the civil rights movement...Our young are rarely taught about the riots, and even many academic sources on the Black movement ignore or downplay the riots. It seems as if those who are old enough to remember the riots are trying to forget them."

Within the sociology field, positive results from the "radical flank effect" are widely acknowledged. The radical flank effect was first named by Herbert H. Haines in his book Black Radicalism and the Civil Rights Mainstream, where he states that "the turmoil which the militants created was indispensable to black progress and indeed, black radicalization had the net effect of enhancing the bargaining position of mainstream civil rights groups and hastening many of their goals...[this finding] has implications for any social movement which is composed of moderate and radical factions..."

In recent years, academic historians have become more forthright about the role of force in the civil rights movement. Scholars such as Charles M. Payne, Akinyele Umoja, and Timothy Tyson explicated on the utility of militant activity (ranging from armed deterrence to mass rioting) in ending formal segregation in the United States. In his book I've Got the Light of Freedom, Payne reflected on the way in which black militancy co-existed with nonviolent ideals:

At one level, there is something inconsistent about Medgar Evers contemplating guerilla warfare against whites in the Delta and simultaneously believing that he can talk to [whites] long enough to be able to change them. The inconsistency is only apparent, a function of the breadth of social vision some Southern blacks developed. They could, like Malcolm X, contemplate the broadest range of oppositional tactics, but like MLK, they never lost a larger sense of common humanity.

Historian Robin Kelley has written that "armed self-defense actually saved lives, reduced terrorist attacks on African American communities, and laid the foundation for unparalleled community solidarity." Although this scholarship has been highly acclaimed, virtually none of its findings have been used in the popular depictions of the movement thus far.

=== Recent writing ===
In the influential anti-capitalist text The Coming Insurrection, the authors prescribe an armed resistance that nonetheless avoids militarization: "Weapons are necessary: it's a question of doing everything possible to make using them unnecessary...the prospect of Iraq-style urban guerilla warfare, dragging on with no possibility of taking the offensive, is more to be feared than to be desired. The militarization of civil war is the defeat of insurrection."

Numerous commentators consider the Ferguson and Baltimore rioting associated with the Black Lives Matter movement to have been productive forms of protest. A member of the Missouri governor's "Ferguson Commission" told the Huffington Post that "If not for the unrest, we wouldn't have seen municipal court reform. It's certainly a game-changer." Grassroots leaders of the movement have refused to condemn episodes of violent protest, and widely "embrace a diversity of tactics."

== Successful examples ==
=== Suffragettes ===
The woman's rights movement in Britain became increasingly militant in the years leading up to the passage of suffrage. The primary instigator of this tendency was Emmeline Pankhurst. Pankhurst's organization, the Women’s Social and Political Union (WSPU), began disrupting political meetings and practicing nonviolent civil disobedience in 1904. The mainstream media made a distinction between the legalist suffragists and the law-breaking "suffragettes"; Pankhurst and her followers nonetheless accepted the latter label.

Beginning in 1908, WSPU engaged in violent protests: smashing windows, fighting police officers, and eventually committing non-lethal bombings. Pankhurst famously said that a "broken pane of glass is the most valuable argument in modern politics," and considered suffragette struggle a form of "civil war." When imprisoned, suffragettes often engaged in hunger-strikes, and were the first high-profile group to systematically engage in this tactic, preceding Mohandas Gandhi by a decade.

Historian Trevor Lloyd wrote that "by [1913] the suffragettes were no longer looking for opportunities for martyrdom. They wanted to fight against society." These activities drove away some of their sympathizers, but Pankhurst was unwavering, stating that:

...if you really want to get anything done, it is not so much a matter of whether you alienate sympathy; sympathy is a very unsatisfactory thing if it is not practical sympathy. It does not matter to the practical suffragist whether she alienates sympathy that was never of any use to her. What she wants is to get something practical done, and whether it is done out of sympathy or whether it is done out of fear...doesn't particularly matter so long as you get it. We had enough of sympathy for fifty years; it never brought us anything, and we would rather have an angry man going to the government and saying, my business is interfered with and I won't submit to its being interfered with any longer because you won't give women the vote, than to have a gentleman come onto our platforms year in and year out and talk about his ardent sympathy with woman's suffrage.

American feminist Alice Paul began her activism with WSPU in Britain and participated in destructive protests there, breaking over forty windows by her own account. Returning to the US, Paul began introducing some suffragette tactics to the feminist movement in her home country. Paul's organization, the National Women's Party, was predominantly nonviolent in its activities, but Paul worked in close solidarity with Emmeline Pankhurst until the passage of suffrage, and hosted appearances by Pankhurst in the US on multiple occasions.

In 1912, Harriot Stanton Blanch changed the name of her organization from the Equality League to the Women's Political Union in order to demonstrate solidarity with the now-violent WSPU. In the months prior to the Nineteenth Amendment's passage, American suffragists experimented with more militant tactics, breaking a window in a struggle with a police officer in October 1918, and burning the president in effigy in front of the White House in February 1919. In May 1919, President Wilson called a special session of Congress for the suffrage amendment. It passed both houses the following month.

=== Civil rights movement ===
The civil rights movement was not consistently nonviolent in a Gandhian sense; even during the Montgomery bus boycott of 1955–1956, most activists, including Martin Luther King Jr., kept arms in their homes. Under the influence of pacifists Bayard Rustin and Glen Smiley, a stricter code of nonviolence took hold in the late 1950s. The period of 1957–1959 was a nadir for the movement: fewer schools were desegregated in the three years following the bus boycott than in the three years prior, and black voter registration and bus desegregation remained stagnant. Activism fell to one of its lowest points of the post-war era, as most African-Americans in the South were terrorized into submission by the Ku Klux Klan.

In 1959, Robert F. Williams, president of the Monroe, North Carolina chapter of the NAACP, made national headlines when he told the press that his chapter was armed and prepared to "meet violence with violence." North Carolina activists had been having successful armed stand-offs against the Klan for several months beforehand, including a Native American action at "The Battle of Hayes Pond."

Williams was suspended for his militancy by NAACP chairman Roy Wilkins, but his policy became nationally popular among the rank-and-file, and the NAACP delegate assembly passed a resolution stating that "We do not deny, but reaffirm the right of individual and collective self-defense against unlawful assaults." Williams continued to promote armed resistance with his publication The Crusader and eventually resumed leadership of the Monroe NAACP chapter.

The national student sit-in movement began with the Greensboro sit-ins in North Carolina several months later. Although initiated as a nonviolent campaign which would not respond to white violence, in some locations, including Portsmouth Virginia and Chattanooga, Tennessee, blacks forcefully defended themselves against assaults. Robert F. Williams led a successful sit-in campaign in Monroe where, he reported, no racists dared to attack his group because it was well-known his use of nonviolence was strictly conditional.

In Jacksonville, Florida, the local NAACP made preparations to defend nonviolent activists by enlisting a local street gang to respond to any attacks. This led to a citywide clash covered nationally as "Axe-handle Saturday" where dozens of blacks and whites were injured in August 1960. Lunch counters were desegregated in Jacksonville and many other sites of protest in the following months. Doug McAdam cited "Axe-handle Saturday" as an example of the specter of violent crisis that loomed over lunch counter sit-ins generally, finding that the threat of escalating chaos pressured authorities to make concessions.

The Freedom Rides of 1961 were originally conceived as a Gandhian campaign. After four months without a decision on desegregated busing from the Interstate Commerce Commission (ICC), James Forman, Executive Secretary of the Student Nonviolent Coordinating Committee (SNCC), led a delegation of nonviolent picketers to Monroe to work with Robert F. Williams. Freedom Riders in Anniston, Alabama, had already benefitted from the protection of an armed group led by Colonel Stone Johnson. The Monroe Freedom Riders were brutally assaulted while picketing city hall, but were rescued by Williams and his group, who proceeded to exchange gunfire with white supremacist civilians and police. Numerous Freedom Riders have expressed gratitude to Williams for saving their lives that day.

The ICC decided in the Freedom Riders’ favor less than one month after the Monroe conflict. In 1962, Freedom Rider John Lowry publicly praised Williams and proclaimed that nonviolent action could not be successful without a "threat of violence." Other civil rights figures who praised Robert F. William's contribution to the movement included Rosa Parks, Julian Bond, Howard Zinn, Stanley Levison, and Ella Baker. The latter two were co-founders of the pacifist Southern Christian Leadership Conference.

== See also ==
- Countering violent extremism
- Deradicalization
