= Margaret Klein Salamon =

Climate activist and clinical psychologist

- Born: 1986 (age 39–40); Ann Arbor, Michigan
- Education: Harvard University, Adelphi University
- Occupations: Climate activist, writer, clinical psychologist

Margaret Klein Salamon (born 1986) is a clinical psychologist and climate activist in the United States. Salamon is a leader of the Climate Emergency Fund, co-founder and leader of The Climate Mobilization, and leader of Climate Awakening. In 2014, she co-founded The Climate Mobilization. She is an advocate for an "all hands on deck" mobilization against climate change and has defended controversial tactics and unlawful activity of Just Stop Oil, which Climate Emergency Fund finances.

== Biography ==
Salamon is a clinical psychologist.

Salamon has highlighted the importance of processing climate grief, the psychological reluctance of individuals to see the climate emergency as a threat, and the importance of empowerment self-defense.

In a 2016 white paper, Salamon argued for a "Climate Emergency Movement" that must treat climate change as emergency and "act as though that truth is real — employing emergency communications, militant tactics, and demanding an emergency mobilization from the government and all society, as the policy response." Salamon argues that these recommendations have been adopted by Extinction Rebellion, the School Strike for Climate, and the Sunrise Movement.

== Organisations ==
In 2014, Salamon co-founded The Climate Mobilization with Ezra Silk at the 2014 People's Climate March. TCM advocates for an emergency mobilization of the economy, politics, and society to respond to climate change. Salamon felt that there were no organizations telling the full truth of the climate emergency.

In 2016, Salamon was one of the originators of the climate emergency declaration movement. She developed the strategy as well as helping to implement the first local declarations in Hoboken New Jersey and Montgomery County, Maryland, as well as working on a National level for a declaration of Climate Emergency.

In 2020, Salamon created Climate Awakening, a group therapy for people struggling with climate anxiety.

In 2021, Salamon became the executive director of the Climate Emergency Fund. The group funds "more aggressive" non-violent civil disobedience about climate change.

== Works ==
- "Leading the Public into Emergency Mode: A New Strategy for the Climate Movement"
- Facing the Climate Emergency: How to Transform Yourself With Climate Truth, ISBN 9780865719415
