= Aileen Getty =

American heiress and activist (born 1957)

Aileen Getty (born 1957) is an American heiress and activist. She is a member of the Getty family, the granddaughter of J. Paul Getty, an American petroleum industrialist who founded the Getty Oil Company. She co-founded the Climate Emergency Fund in 2019. The fund has distributed over $4 million to several environmental activist organizations including Extinction Rebellion and Just Stop Oil.

== Early life ==
She is the daughter of John Paul Getty Jr. Her brother Mark Getty is the co-founder of Getty Images.

She spent her childhood in Italy and attended boarding school in the United Kingdom.

== Activism ==
In 2019, Getty co-founded the Climate Emergency Fund. The fund has distributed over $4 million to several environmental activist organizations including Extinction Rebellion and Just Stop Oil.

As of 2018, she has given $92,400 to campaigns and independent committees of Gavin Newsom.

== Personal life ==
In 1981, she married Christopher Wilding, son of Elizabeth Taylor. They had two children before divorcing.

In 1984, she was diagnosed with HIV/AIDS, later saying she was unsure whether the source of infection had been a blood transfusion or an extramarital affair.

In 2023, Getty purchased Brad Pitt’s estate near Los Feliz for $33 million.
