= Youth Demand =

British environmental activism group

- The current logo of Youth Demand

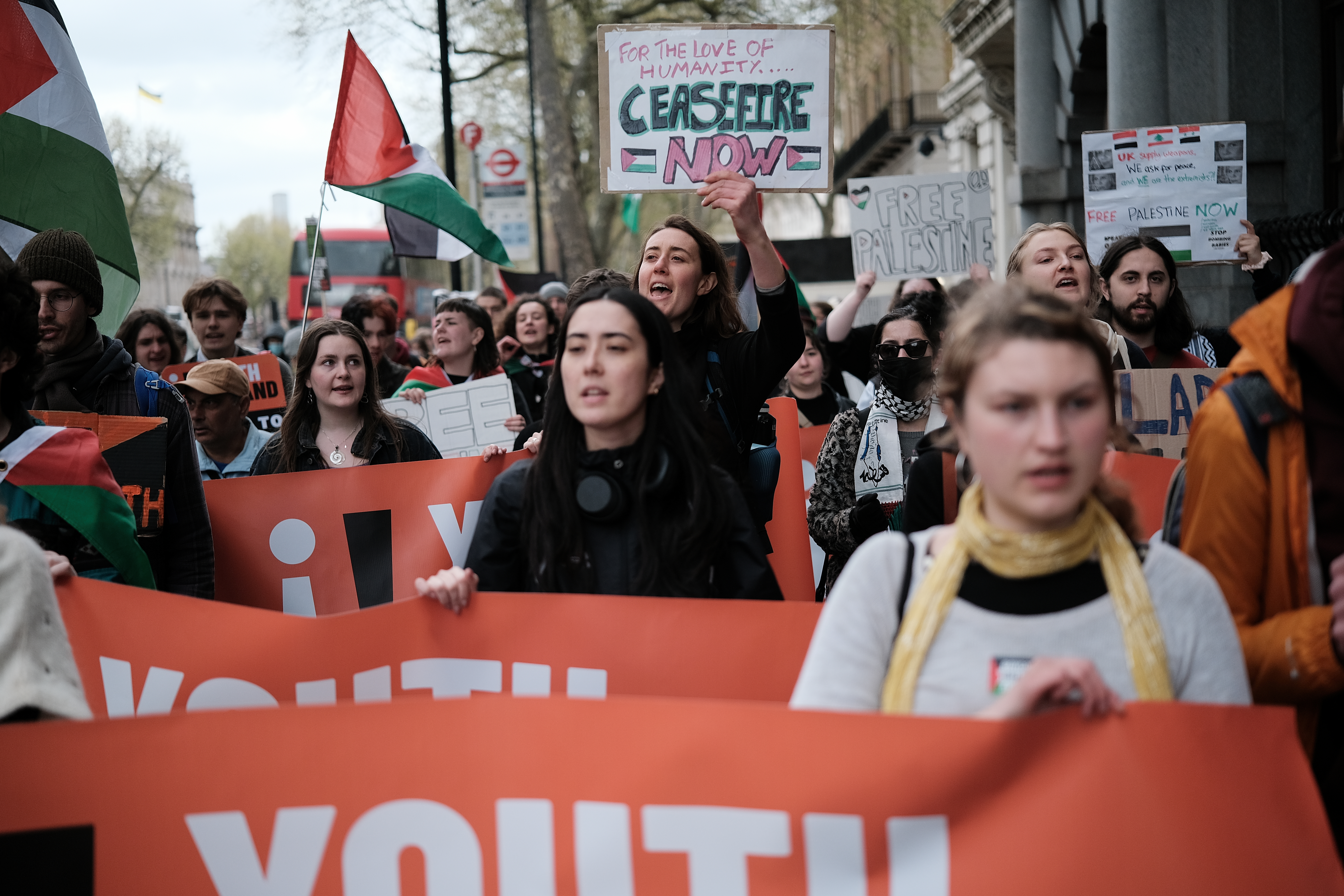
- Youth Demand supporters at the Gaza Ceasefire Now march in London, April 2024
- Successor: Take Back Power
- Formation: January 2024
- Founded at: Birmingham
- Region served: United Kingdom
- Methods: Non-violent resistance, civil resistance, direct action, vandalism, traffic obstruction
- Parent organisation: Umbrella
- Affiliations: Just Stop Oil
- Website: youthdemand.org

Youth Demand is an environmental activist and political activist group which is calling for the British government to stop all trade with Israel and an end for new licences for fossil fuel exploration in the North Sea.

== Background and aims ==
The group was established in January 2024 after a meeting at the Old Print Works in Birmingham as one of four groups under a central coordinating group called Umbrella. The four groups under 'Umbrella' are the direct action group Just Stop Oil, Assemble, Robin Hood, and Youth Demand.

In July 2024 a spokesperson for Youth Demand said that their aims were "an end to all new licenses and consents for exploration of fossil fuels in the North Sea" and the imposition of "a two-way arms embargo on the state of Israel ... [to] stop selling them weapons and we stop buying their weapons. We sever all the links between the UK and the Israeli war machine".

Youth Demand claim to be represented at 17 British universities and have 5,000-10,000 people on a mailing list.

== Protest actions and arrests ==
The first protest led by Youth Demand took place on 30th March 2024 at the Oxford-Cambridge boat race on the River Thames. Members of the group attempted to disrupt the Mens Senior race by draping a banner over Chiswick Bridge, the finish line for the race. Two young people were arrested under Section 1 of the Public Order Act 2023, while another two were arrested under Section 2 of the Public Order Act 2023. The event was already marked by controversy due to the presence of large quantities of E.coli in the water as a result of sewage discharges by Thames Water.

On 8th April 2024, five supporters of Youth Demand took part in a protest at the Labour Party Headquarters. Five individuals used modified fire extinguishers to eject red paint on the outside of the building, and inside the lobby, a technique originating in British graffiti culture. Officers from the Met police arrested 12 people in connection with the incident on suspicion of criminal damage.

On 9th April 2024, three individuals staged a protest outside the home of the leader of the Labour Party, and future prime minister, Keir Starmer. The protest involved the draping of a banner reading "Starmer Stop The Killing", placing childrens shoes on the ground outside the front door, and sitting with placards and a Palestine flag. The action prompted outrage from numerous high profile politicians including the current prime minister, Rishi Sunak, and the home secretary, James Cleverly, bringing significant attention to the protest. Police responded to the protest by arresting three individuals under Section 42 of the Criminal Justice and Police Act 2001, designed to "stop the harassment of a person at their home address". Victoria Starmer, wife of Keir Starmer, gave evidence at the trial. The three defendents, Leonorah Ward, Zosia Lewis, and Daniel Formentin, were ultimately found guilty, and were handed six week suspended sentences.

On the next day, 10th April 2024, Youth Demand and Palestine Action undertook a joint protest at the Ministry of Defence. Five people used pressurized fire extinguishers to cover the external walls of the building in red paint. The defence secretary at the time, Grant Shapps, responded publicly by describing the protestors as "cowardly criminals".

At an event at Cambridge University on 8th May, 2024, Youth Demand supporters disrupted an event featuring Palantir founder, Peter Thiel, due to firms links with the Israeli Defence Force. Outside of the event, several hundred protestors blocked Thiel's vehicle from leaving the area for over an hour.

On 11th May 2024, hundreds of Youth Demand supporters, joined by several other pro-Palestine campaign groups, took part in a protest on Waterloo Bridge in response to the offensive in Rafah. From 5pm, teams of individuals blocked access roads onto the bridge, allowing a large crowd to proceed to enter it from Jubilee Gardens.

Five individuals from Youth Demand and campaign group Stop Polluting Politics disrupted an event hosted by the Institute for Public Policy Research in London, on 21 May 2024. As David Lammy began his key-note speech, action takers rose from their seats, chanting "Free Palestine". The interruption lasted for 10 minutes.

Youth Demand supporters were arrested in Waterloo at a march on 1st June 2024. Several individuals were arrested during the march, as it was proceeding down Belvedere road.

On 15th June 2024, three Youth Demand supporters climbed onto the roof of the Labour Party battle bus during a campaign rally in Wrexham. The protestors stood with a Palestine flag and a banner reading "Youth Demand an End to Genocide".

At Oxford Circus, on 22nd June 2024, dozens of Youth Demand supporters were arrested during a road block protest. The major junction between Oxford street and Regent street was blocked for roughly an hour before police were able to reopen the road.

On 25th June 2024, Youth Demand staged a protest at Rishi Sunak's house in North Yorkshire. The action involved a protestor wearing a shirt with the words "each shit Rishi" excreting into a pond on the grounds of the property. The action was taken following announcement from the government of the upcoming general election. Police arrived on the scene, and arrested four people, including a press photographer who had attended to document the event. After some speculation, the faeces were revealed to be fake.

Youth Demand began their July action campaign by blocking the Marble Arch junction on 13th July 2024. The large group initially met in Russell Square Gardens where individuals were searched by police. Due to the anticipated large police presence, the crowd split into many small groups before travelling separately to Marble Arch, the site of the road block. Ultimately, seven individuals were arrested, and the road was reopened after approximately 50 minutes

On 15 July 2024, two members of the group were arrested after spray-painting '180,000 killed' on the pavement in front of the Cenotaph on Whitehall.

10 members of the group were arrested in Victoria Embankment Gardens on the day of the State Opening of Parliament on 17 July 2024.

Six Youth Demand supporters were arrested during a welcome talk at a Quaker meeting house (the Westminster Meeting House) on 27 March 2025; according to the Metropolitan Police, Youth Demand intended to "shut down" London during April by means of tactics which include road blocks. Five other supporters were subsequently arrested elsewhere on similar charges. George Monbiot wrote that the Metropolitan Police action is both disproportionate and inconsistent.

On 12 April 2025, eight supporters of the group were arrested during an 'open swarming' protest in which members blocked traffic at Elephant and Castle, by Russell Square, and at Vauxhall Bridge.
