= Peach Trees in Blossom =

Painting by Vincent van Gogh

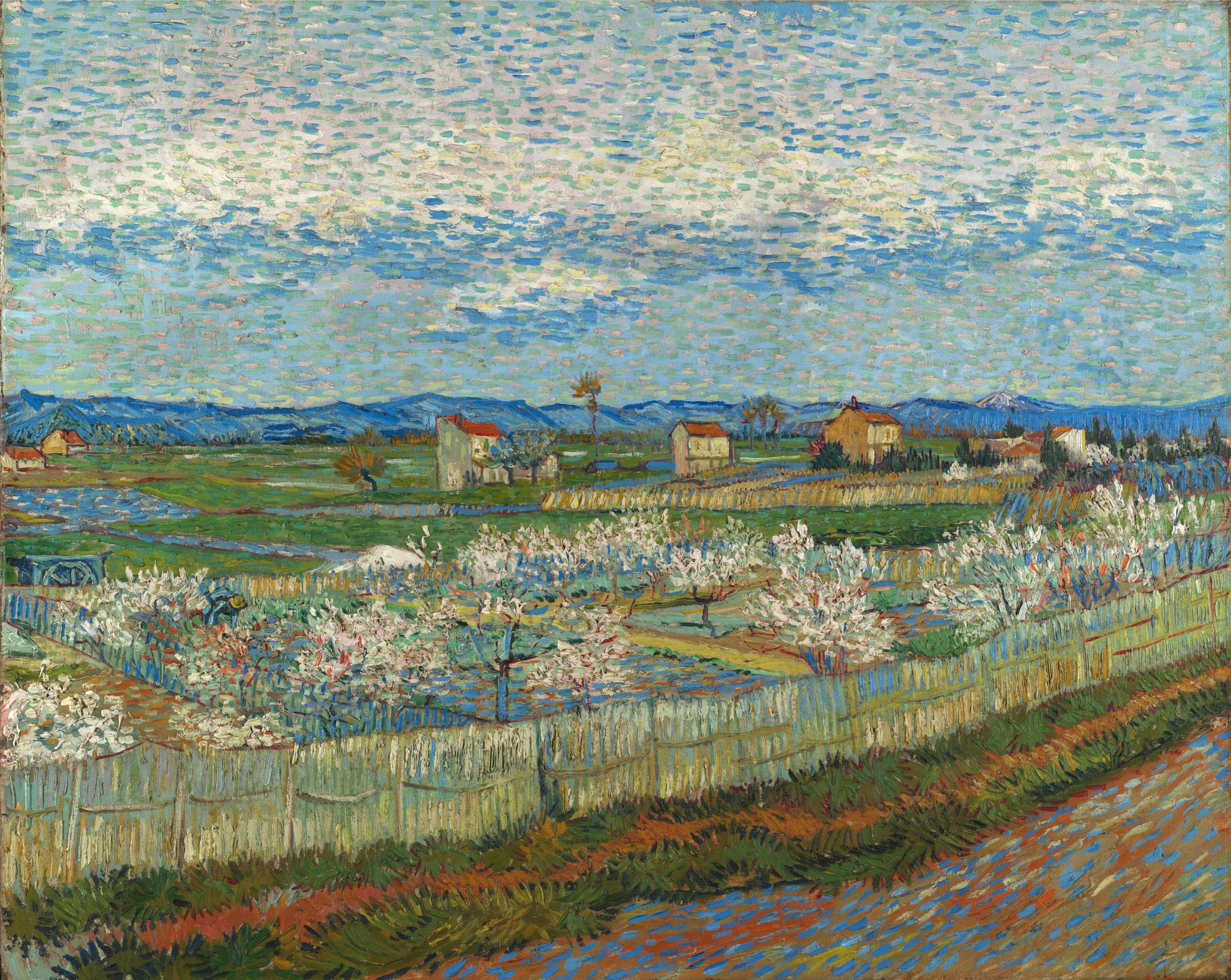
- Artist: Vincent van Gogh
- Year: 1889
- Catalogue: F514; JH1681
- Medium: Oil on canvas
- Dimensions: 65 cm × 81 cm (25.5 in × 31.8 in)
- Location: Courtauld Institute of Art; London

Peach Trees in Blossom is an 1889 painting by Vincent van Gogh. It is in the collection of the Courtauld Institute of Art. The painting depicts a field with peach trees on the outskirts of Arles with the Alpilles mountains in the background. The painting was intended as a homage to Japanese landscape prints which influenced Van Gogh. It was created a few months after he had severed his ear and during a mentally unstable period in which he was still a patient at the men's hospital in Arles.

Van Gogh wrote to his brother, Theo van Gogh in April 1889 about his work on the painting, and subsequently included a sketch of the work in a letter to Paul Signac sent on 10 April 1889.

== History ==
Peach Trees in Blossom was bought by the Belgian artist Anna Boch in 1891 for 350 francs (equivalent to £14 in 1891 and equivalent to £1,538 in 2025). It was next acquired in 1927 by Samuel Courtauld for £9,000 (equivalent to £488,842 in 2025). The painting was hung by Courtauld in the Etruscan Room of his house in Portman Square in Marylebone.

The painting was lent by Courtauld to an exhibition in the Village Hall of Silver End in Essex in 1935, as part of a project called 'Art for the People' to broaden public access to works of art. In a 1935 letter to Lady Aberconway, Courtauld recalled that a recent drive through the countryside of Kent reminded him of the painting with its "bright green grass & blossoming fruit trees & the newly washed sky & water glistening everywhere". The work presently hangs in the Great Room of the Courthald Institute of Art.

On 30 June 2022 two protesters from Just Stop Oil glued themselves to the frame of the painting and caused £2,000 of damage to it. Both were found guilty of causing criminal damage to the painting, one was found jailed for three weeks and the other received a suspended sentence.
