= Westminster Meeting House =

Quaker place of worship in London

Coordinates: 51.51077°N 0.12684°W

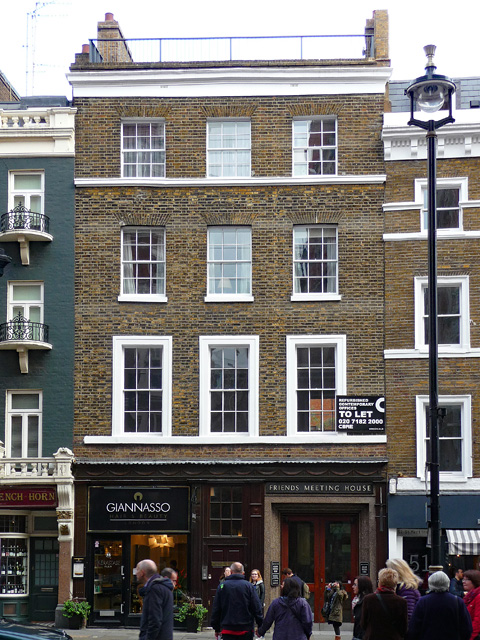
The Westminster Meeting House in November 2014

Westminster Quaker Meeting House is a place of worship of the Religious Society of Friends located behind 52 St Martin's Lane in Covent Garden, London WC2. It shares its frontage with an adjoining shop. Westminster Quakers have been meeting at this location since 1883.

== Meetings ==
Access to the meeting house is through a listed 18th century town house listed Grade II on the National Heritage List for England.

Meetings for worship are held on Sundays from 11am to 12pm; on the first Tuesday of each month from 1 to 1:30pm and on Wednesdays from 6:15 to 7pm.

== History ==
The philosopher Bertrand Russell and the activist Alys Pearsall Smith married in the meeting house in 1894. In Russell's autobiography he relates that the guests at the wedding seemed moved to preach about the Miracle at Cana which offended his bride's teetotal sensibility. The artist Richard Morris Smith made a drawing of their wedding and a photograph of the drawing was donated to the National Portrait Gallery by Barbara Halpern in 1999.

On 27 March 2025, over 20 uniformed police forced their way into the Meeting House and arrested six young women on suspicion of conspiracy to cause a public nuisance while holding a Youth Demand group meeting over concerns for the climate and Gaza. One was released with no further action, and the others were released on bail. The Quakers issued a statement saying "This aggressive violation of our place of worship and the forceful removal of young people holding a protest group meeting clearly shows what happens when a society criminalises protest."

== In popular culture ==
The Westminster Meeting House appears in the second season of the BBC comedy-drama Fleabag (2019), in a scene where the characters Fleabag and the Priest take part in a fictional silent meeting.
