= Steven F. Lawson =

American historian

- Born: June 14, 1945 (age 81); New York City, New York; United States

Academic background
- Education: City College of New York (BA); Columbia University (MA, PhD)
- Thesis: Give Us the Ballot: The Expansion of Black Voting Rights in the South, 1944-1969 (1974)
- Doctoral advisor: William Leuchtenburg

Academic work
- Institutions: Rutgers University; Professor Emeritus of History Past career: University of Cambridge; Duke University Visiting Adjunct Professor (Fall of 1995); University of North Carolina at Greensboro Professor and Head (1992-1998); University of South Florida Professor (1986) Asst. Professor (1978, 1974) Instructor (1972); City College of New York Adjunct Lecturer (1970); Kingsborough Community College
- Main interests: U.S. since 1945; Civil Rights Movement; African-American Politics; Political And Legal History
- Notable works: Black Ballots (1976); In Pursuit of Power (1985); Running for Freedom (1991); Debating the Civil Rights Movement (1998)

Steven Fred Lawson (born June 14, 1945) is an American historian of the Civil Rights Movement in the United States. He is an emeritus professor at Rutgers University–New Brunswick.

== Life and career ==
Born in the Bronx, New York, he is the son of Ceil Parker Lawson, a housewife, and Murray Lawson, a retail hardware clerk. He had a sister, Lona Lawson Mirchin, who died in 2004.

He earned his Ph.D. in history from Columbia University in 1974. After teaching at various colleges and universities for forty years, he is now retired, works as an independent scholar, and shares a home in New Jersey with his wife Nancy A. Hewitt and their miniature poodle, Scooter (named after 1950s New York Yankees star and broadcaster Phil Rizzuto).

== List of works ==
=== Books ===
- (2012) Exploring American Histories. Bedford/St. Martin’s Press.(with Nancy A. Hewitt)
- (2009) One America in the Twenty-first Century: The Report of President Bill Clinton’s Initiative on Race. New Haven, Yale University Press
- (2004) To Secure These Rights: President Harry S Truman’s Committee on Civil Rights Boston: Bedford-St. Martin's.
- (2003) Civil Rights Crossroads: Nation, Community, and the Black Freedom Struggle. University Press of Kentucky. 2003. ISBN 978-0-8131-2287-8.
- (2003) Co-authors Darlene Clark Hine; Merline Pitre. Black Victory: The Rise and Fall of the White Primary in Texas. University of Missouri Press.
- (1998) Co-author Charles Payne. Debating the Civil Rights Movement, 1945-1968. Lanham, Maryland: Rowman- Littlefield.
- (1997) Running for Freedom: Civil Rights and Black Politics in America Since 1941 (Second ed.). New York: McGraw-Hill.
- (1985) In Pursuit of Power: Southern Blacks and Electoral Politics, 1965–1982. New York: Columbia University Press.
- (1976) Black Ballots: Voting Rights in the South, 1944-1969 (Reprint with new preface ed.). Lanham, Maryland: Lexington Books.

=== Journals ===
- "Preserving the Second Reconstruction: Enforcement of the Voting Rights Act, 1965-1975". Southern Studies. 22 (1). Spring 1983.
- "Freedom Then, Freedom Now: The Historiography of the Civil Rights Movement," American Historical Review, 96 (April 1991): 456- 71.
- Race and Reapportionment, 1962: The Case of Georgia Senate Redistricting, Journal of Policy History, 12(Summer, 2000): 1-28(co-author with Peyton McCrary).

=== Newspapers ===
- Lawson, Steven F. (August 28, 2013). "The Opinion Pages: 'I Have a Dream,' Then and Now". The New York Times.
- Lawson, Steven F.; Hewitt, Nancy A. (June 6, 2011). "Letters to the Editor: United Against Aids (2 Letters)". The New York Times.
- Lawson, Steven F. (November 9, 2008). "The first – and last? – black president". The Boston Globe. p. 134.
- Lawson, Steven F.; Perez, Louis A. Jr. (March 31, 1978). "Oral History". St. Petersburg Independent. p. 15A.
