= The Climate Mobilization =

US climate change advocacy organization

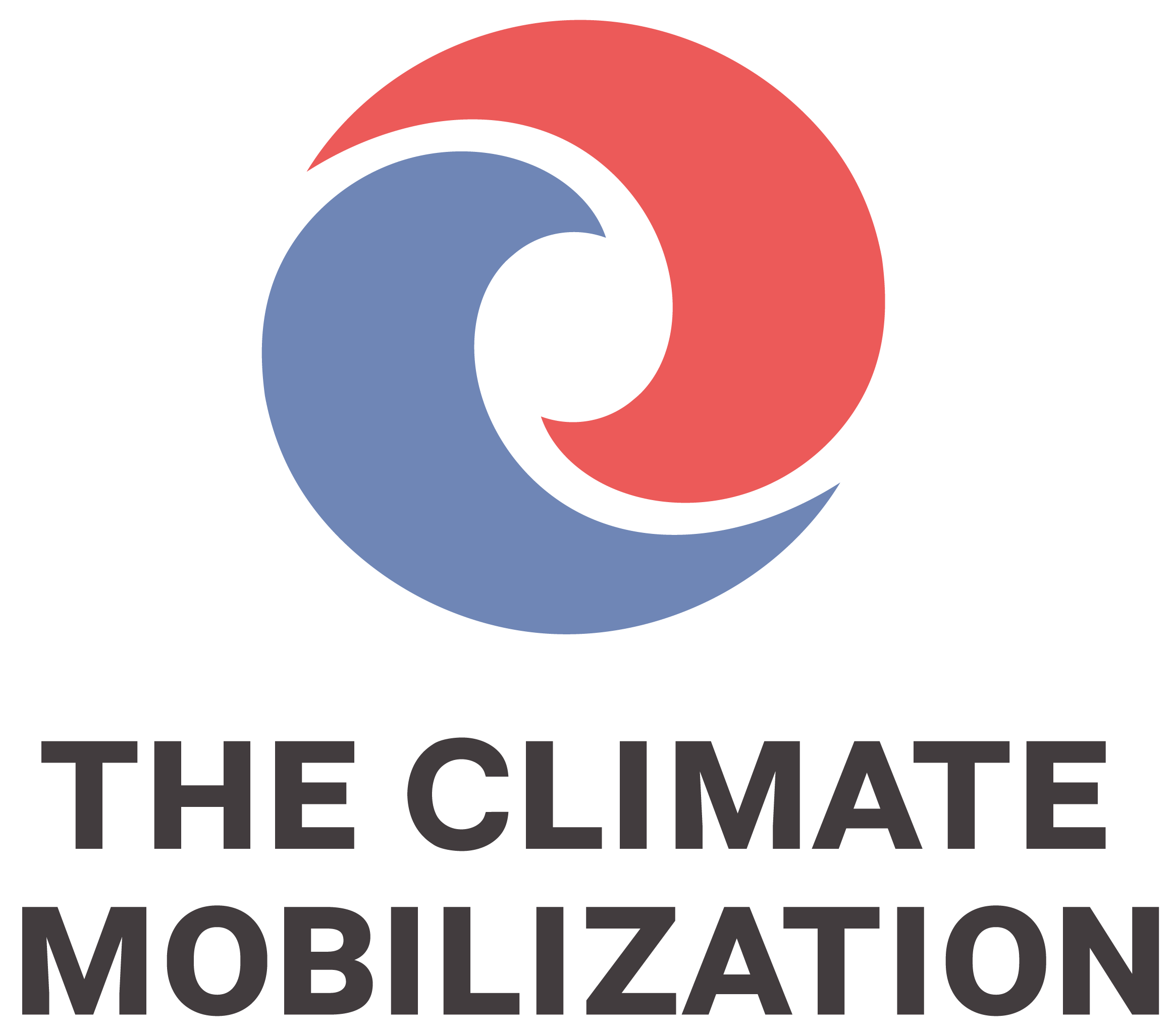
- Formation: 2014
- Type: NGO
- Purpose: build political will for a WWII-scale climate mobilization
- Headquarters: New York City
- Founders: Margaret Klein Salamon, Ezra Silk
- Website: TheClimateMobilization.org

The Climate Mobilization (TCM) is a grassroots environmental advocacy group working toward large-scale political action against global warming. It believes that the crisis of climate change requires a national economic effort on the scale of the American mobilization of the home front during World War II, in order to transform the USA economy speedily.

TCM was founded by Margaret Klein Salamon to confront climate change denial and build the political will necessary to achieve the rapid and just transformation of the physical economy and society at large, delivering an integrated package of solutions for a regenerative, zero emissions and safe-climate economy, geared toward reversing global warming and the sixth mass extinction of species as rapidly as possible.

== History ==
Since at least 2008, public figures like environmental analyst Lester Brown, former vice president Al Gore, author and energy expert Joseph J. Romm, New York Times columnist Thomas Friedman, writer Naomi Klein, and climate activist Bill McKibben have called for governmental climate action on the scale of the World War II mobilization to rapidly reduce greenhouse gas emissions. In 2011, the heads of leading environmental organizations including 350.org, Sierra Club, Greenpeace, Friends of the Earth, and Rainforest Action Network signed a letter to Presidents Barack Obama and Hu Jintao calling for a "wartime-like mobilization" by the governments of the United States and China to cut carbon emissions 80% (based on 2006 levels) by 2020. However, environmental groups in the United States never organized politically for such an ambitious goal.

The Climate Mobilization was launched in September 2014, before the People's Climate March in New York City, specifically to organize politically around the concept of a rapid, World War II-scale government mobilization against climate change. Margaret Klein Salamon, Ezra Silk and allies developed a pledge-based movement-building strategy in which signers agree to vote for political candidates who have signed the pledge over those who have not. The Climate Mobilization's "Pledge to Mobilize" calls on the United States government to commence a World War II-scale mobilization against climate change in order to decrease net greenhouse gas emissions 100% by 2025, deploy a system of removing greenhouse gases (GHG) from the atmosphere with wartime speed, and make reducing net GHGs 100% globally, with the same swiftness, a top political priority.

Throughout 2015, citizen activists in California, Iowa and elsewhere in the U.S. began rallying for World War II-scale national climate mobilization, and spreading the Climate Mobilization pledge to local political candidates.

In January 2016, The Climate Mobilization sponsored a "Climate Emergency Caucus" in Des Moines before the Iowa caucuses, which simulated the state's 2016 Democratic presidential primary caucus. Former U.S. Senator Tom Harkin spoke on behalf of candidate Hillary Clinton, and climate advocates Jane Kleeb, founder of Bold Nebraska, and Iowa politician and radio host Ed Fallon spoke on behalf of candidate Bernie Sanders. Sanders won 67% of the vote, reinforcing the perception that voters highly concerned about climate change strongly preferred Sanders over Clinton, and that climate voters were a key voting bloc contributing to his competitiveness in Iowa and later primary states. Throughout his presidential campaign, Sanders discussed fighting climate change "in military terms", saying at one point during a debate against Clinton that "if we approach this as if we were at war", the U.S. could be up to the challenge, as it was during World War II.

In April 2016, The Climate Mobilization organized a "die-in" outside the United Nations building in New York City during the signing of the COP 21 Paris Agreement, meant to protest what the group called the agreement's inadequacy in relation to the scale of the threat of climate change. TCM deputy director Ezra Silk called the agreement "historic in the sense that the Munich Agreement was historic - a catastrophic act of appeasement meant to maintain business-as-usual arrangements." He explained: "It's widely recognized that this agreement is not even close to what is needed... It doesn't really convey a sense of urgency [so] we wanted to sort of inject some reality into the discussion. We need to go on to an emergency war footing like right now ... The climate is already dangerous, we're already in an emergency. It is understood within the climate movement that this is the kind of approach that is needed. It's just considered politically unrealistic. Our goal is to change the political possibility."

In July 2016, the national platform committee of the Democratic Party of the United States approved an amendment submitted by Climate Mobilization activist Russell Greene committing the party to a World War II-scale international mobilization against climate change: "We believe the United States must lead in forging a robust global solution to the climate crisis. We are committed to a national mobilization, and to leading a global effort to mobilize nations to address this threat on a scale not seen since World War II. In the first 100 days of the next administration, the President will convene a summit of the world's best engineers, climate scientists, policy experts, activists, and indigenous communities to chart a course to solve the climate crisis."

Politicians who have signed the Climate Mobilization pledge include San Luis Obispo mayor Heidi Harmon, Des Moines mayor Frank Cownie; Iowa State Rep. Dan Kelley; Iowa State Senator and U.S. Senate candidate Rob Hogg; New York State Senate candidate Debbie Medina; and U.S. congressional candidates Peter Jacob of New Jersey, and Tim Canova, Darren Soto, and Alina Valdes of Florida.

== Advisory board ==
TCM's advisory board includes:

- Laura Dawn, former MoveOn.org creative director
- Paul Gilding, former Greenpeace International director
- Richard Heinberg, journalist and Post Carbon Institute senior fellow
- Marshall Herskovitz, film producer
- Dr. Michael E. Mann, climate scientist
- Adam McKay, producer, director, screenwriter of films such as The Big Short
- Jamila Raqib, director of the Albert Einstein Institution
- Gus Speth, environmental lawyer
- David Spratt and Philip Sutton, coauthors of Climate Code Red
- Lise Van Susteren, psychiatrist and environmental activist
- Rev. Lennox Yearwood Jr. of the Hip Hop Caucus

== See also ==
- War economy
- Mass production of equipment during World War 2
- Large-scale plant propagation
