= Radical flank effect =

Effects of radical activists for a cause

The radical flank effect is the effect, whether positive or negative, that radical activists have on more moderate activists for the same cause.

According to Riley Dunlap, the idea of a radical flank effect "has a lot of credibility among social-movement scholars".

== History ==
In 1975, Jo Freeman introduced the term "radical flank" with reference to more revolutionary women's groups, "against which other feminist organizations and individuals could appear respectable."

The term "radical flank effect" was coined by Herbert H. Haines. In 1984, Haines found that moderate black organizations saw increased rather than decreased funding as the radical black movement emerged. In his 1988 Black Radicals and the Civil Rights Mainstream, 1954–1970, Haines challenged the prevailing view that confrontational and militant black activists created a "white backlash" against the more moderate civil-rights movement. Rather, Haines argued, "the turmoil which the militants created was indispensable to black progress" and helped mainstream civil-rights groups.

Haines measured positive outcomes based on increases in external income to moderate organizations and legislative victories. While nearly half of the income data was estimated or missing due to the refusal of the Southern Christian Leadership Conference and the Congress of Racial Equality to divulge their complete financial records, it was more extensive than the data used by Doug McAdam in his classic work on resource mobilization. Haines' data was thorough for the moderate organizations (such as the NAACP) which comprised the dependent variable for his research.

== Positive and negative effects ==
=== Positive ===
- Radicals make moderates appear more reasonable by shifting the boundaries of discourse (see Overton window), such as when radical feminists in the 1960s-70s made reformist women's groups seem mild. ExxonMobil's radical stance rejecting climate change allowed BP to appear more moderate when it acknowledged in 1997 that human-caused climate change existed and posed a problem.
- Radicals may also create crises that authorities seek to resolve through concessions to moderates. An example was acceptance of labor unions as a means to stave off more radical demands by workers to exercise greater control of production systems. When Rainforest Action Network threatened Staples Inc. with protests exhorting it to sell more recycled paper, Staples responded by asking help from the more moderate Environmental Defense Fund.
- Armed radical flanks often protect more moderate nonviolent activists from repression, thereby allowing the nonviolent actions to continue. In 1964, the Deacons for Defense and Justice militia were guardians of the pacifist CORE chapter in Louisiana, and later protected Martin Luther King Jr. and other demonstrators during the March Against Fear.

=== Negative ===
- Radicals may discredit a movement.
- Radicals might make it harder for moderates to collaborate with third parties.

== Predictors of positive flank effects ==
It's difficult to tell without hindsight whether the radical flank of a movement will have positive or negative effects. However, following are some factors that have been proposed as making positive effects more likely:

- Greater differentiation between moderates and radicals in the presence of a weak government. As Charles Dobson puts it: "To secure their place, the new moderates have to denounce the actions of their extremist counterparts as irresponsible, immoral, and counterproductive. The most astute will quietly encourage 'responsible extremism' at the same time."
- Existing momentum behind the cause. If change seems likely to happen anyway, then governments are more willing to accept moderate reforms in order to quell radicals.
- Radicalism during the peak of activism, before concessions are won. After the movement begins to decline, radical factions may damage the image of moderate organizations.
- Low polarization. If there's high polarization with a strong opposing side, the opposing side can point to the radicals in order to hurt the moderates.

== Game-theoretic formulation ==
Devashree Gupta developed a game-theoretic model of radical flank effects. In addition to distinguishing positive vs. negative flank effects on moderates, she suggested also considering effects on radicals:

| | Moderates gain | Moderates lose |
|---|---|---|
| Radicals gain | Overall movement strengthened (INCR) | Movement becomes radicalized, driving away moderates; negative radical flank effect (RFE-) |
| Radicals lose | Moderation of movement with mild concessions; positive radical flank effect (RFE+) | Overall movement weakened (DECR) |

Her extensive-form game involved a choice by moderates of whether to clearly distinguish themselves from radicals, and then a choice by the external actors being lobbied as to whether to grant concessions:

- If moderates distinguish themselves from radicals:
  - If external actors grant concessions:
    - RFE+ (concessions granted to moderates only)
  - If external actors refuse concessions:
    - If external actors are strong:
      - DECR (whole movement is repressed)
    - If external actors are weak:
      - RFE- (movement becomes radicalized)
- If moderates do not distinguish themselves from radicals:
  - If external actors grant concessions:
    - INCR (concessions granted to the movement as a whole)
  - If external actors refuse concessions:
    - If external actors are strong:
      - DECR (whole movement is repressed)
    - If external actors are weak:
      - INCR (movement as a whole wins)

== Violent radical flank ==
In the radical-flank literature, "radical" may mean either more extreme in views and demands or more extreme in activist methods, possibly including the use of violence.

Studies of civil resistance have typically found that nonviolent activism is ideal, since violence by a movement makes state repression seem legitimate. That is, violence yields a negative radical flank effect. Indeed, states sometimes seek to label nonviolent movements as terrorist and violent, or incite them to violence through provocation and agents provocateurs, in order to justify suppression.

Barrington Moore, Jr., in books such as Social Origins of Dictatorship and Democracy and A Critique of Pure Tolerance, observed the prominent use of violence which preceded the development of democratic institutions in England, France and the United States. A survey of Moore's critics notes that they were generally "impressed by Moore's case for progressive violence, but eager to move on to other topics, instead of considering the implications of these issues."

In a study of 53 "challenging groups", social movement analyst William Gamson found that groups that were willing to use "force and violence" against their opponents tended to be more successful than groups that were not.

In a cross-national quantitative analysis of 106 maximalist campaigns, Erica Chenoweth and Kurt Schock examined armed flank effects (not radical or violent flank effects). They found no general pattern of armed flank direct effects across 106 cases. However, in the case studies they found evidence for both positive and negative armed flank effects.

Francis Fox Piven writes that the use of violence in social movements is often under-reported by activists cultivating a nonviolent image, as well as by social movement scholars who are sympathetic to them.

Some recent studies have compared the violent flank with the diversity of tactics effect, and found both to have positive effects in movement campaigns.

The African National Congress believe that both nonviolence and armed conflict were important in ending Apartheid. John Bradford Braithwaite concludes from this that when violent factions already exist, moderates should not necessarily shun them, but moderates should not seek to create violent factions.

== See also ==
- Black power
- Dark greens, light greens and bright greens
- Diversity of tactics
- Overton window
