= Climate Emergency Fund =

Los Angeles based nonprofit organization

- Formation: 2019; 7 years ago
- Type: Nonprofit
- Website: www.climateemergencyfund.org

Climate Emergency Fund (CEF) is a US-based nonprofit organization that supports climate change activist groups involved in non-violent direct action. It was founded in 2019 by filmmaker Rory Kennedy, a member of the prominent Kennedy family, and Getty family heiress Aileen Getty.

== Activities ==
Climate Emergency Fund often supports groups that use non-violent direct action tactics, including Just Stop Oil, Last Generation and Climate Defiance.

Since supporting actions targeting Inflation Reduction Act hold-outs during the Biden administration, Climate Emergency Fund has since been a strong supporter of the nationwide AI data center resistance movement.

== Funding ==
As of August 2022, Getty has donated $1 million to the fund. When he joined the board of directors in September 2022, film director Adam McKay pledged $4 million to the fund.

In 2019, the Nonprofit Quarterly described Climate Emergency Fund's mission as dedicated to "a more aggressive strategy to address the climate crisis"

== Leadership ==
Philip Eubanks is the current executive director.

=== Board of directors ===
- Adam McKay, film director (September 2022–present)
- Rose Abramoff, climate scientist (June 2023–present)
- Chris Packham CBE, naturalist, nature photographer, television presenter and author (October 2024-present)
- Steven Donziger, former attorney who famously sued Chevron (August 2025-Present)
- Margaret Klein Salamon, clinical psychologist and climate activist,

== See also ==
- Just Stop Oil
- Climate Defiance
- Margaret Klein Salamon
