= Charles M. Payne =

American academic (born 1948)

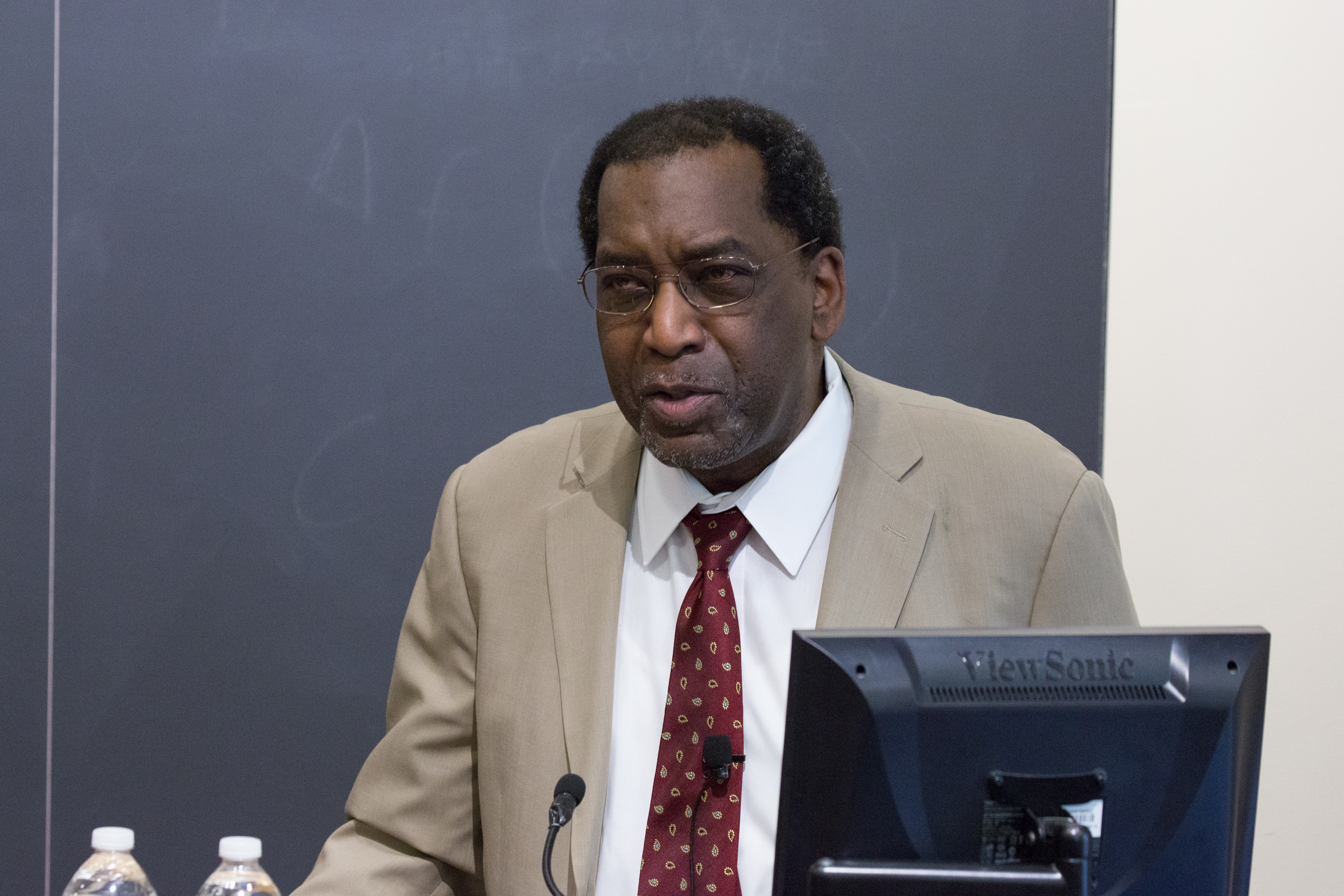
- Payne in 2016
- Born: March 14, 1948 (age 78)
- Education: Syracuse University; Northwestern University
- Occupation: Academic

Charles M. Payne Jr. (born March 14, 1948) is an American academic whose areas of study include civil rights activism, urban education reform, social inequality, and modern African-American history. He was the Chief Education Officer for Chicago Public Schools.

== Education and career ==
Charles Payne received a bachelor's degree in Afro-American studies from Syracuse University in 1970 and a Ph.D. in sociology from Northwestern University in 1976. He has held professorial positions and endowed chairs at several American institutions, among them Southern University, Williams College, Haverford College, Northwestern, Duke University, where he held the Sally Dalton Robinson Chair for Teaching Excellence, and the Frank P. Hixon Distinguished Service Professor in the School of Social Service Administration (now Crown Family School of Social Work, Policy, and Practice).

Payne has also been active in the creation and direction of several organizations intended to address issues of social justice. He is the founding director of the Urban Education Project in Orange, New Jersey, a community-based effort to provide advanced career training for local youth. While at Duke, he co-founded the John Hope Franklin Scholars, a program that helps Durham-area high schoolers prepare for and apply to college. His other projects have included the Duke Curriculum Project, the Education for Liberators Network, and work with the Chicago Algebra Project and with the Steering Committee for the Consortium on Chicago School Research.

His most recent books are So Much Reform, So Little Change (Harvard Education Publication Group, 2008) and an anthology about the African-American tradition of education for liberation entitled Teach Freedom (Teacher's College Press, 2008).

== Publications ==
- Getting What We Ask For: The Ambiguity of Success and Failure In Urban Education (1984)
- I've Got the Light of Freedom: The Organizing Tradition and the Mississippi Freedom Struggle (1995)]
- Co-author (with Steven F. Lawson), Debating the Civil Rights Movement (1999)
- Co-editor (with Adam Green), Time Longer Than Rope: A Century of African American Activism, 1850-1950 (2003)
- So Much Reform, So Little Change: The Persistence of Failure in Urban Schools (2008)
- Co-editor (with Carol Sills Strickland), Teach Freedom: Education for Liberation in the African-American Tradition (2008)
- Various articles on urban education and civil rights.
