= I've Got the Light of Freedom =

1995 book by Charles M. Payne

I've Got the Light of Freedom: The Organizing Tradition and the Mississippi Freedom Struggle
- First edition cover
- Author: Charles M. Payne
- Language: English
- Genre: non fiction
- Publisher: University of California Press
- Media type: Print (hardback and paperback)

I've Got the Light of Freedom: The Organizing Tradition and the Mississippi Freedom Struggle is a non-fiction book published in 1995 by American author Charles M. Payne, published by University of California Press.

The author chronicled the stories of various figures overlooked in the Civil Rights Movement, including many senior citizens involved. Payne himself criticized the focus on a few prominent people instead of many ordinary people. Several articles include life stories of particular people involved in the movement. Much of the narrative concerns Greenwood, Mississippi and events related to it. Payne has a focus on events rooted in particular communities and argued that the movement was based in each location rather than being primarily nationwide, and he stated that in Mississippi the movement originated from a form of community organizing developed in the state and not primarily from black churches.

The book has a focus on community organization affairs instead of having a holistic coverage of the history.

Robert J. Norrell stated that compared to Local People: The Struggle for Civil Rights in Mississippi, this book is "more expansive" and "less comprehensive and chronological".

== Reception ==
Publishers Weekly stated that the book is "thoughtful".

Stewart Burns of Stanford University stated that the book is a "remarkable study", praising its "careful structure" and "vivid, engaging prose".

Mary L. Dudziak of the University of Iowa described the book as "essential reading" in its field; she stated that the volume may be more difficult for an "uninitiated reader" in the subject to handle.
