= Just Stop Oil =

British climate activism group

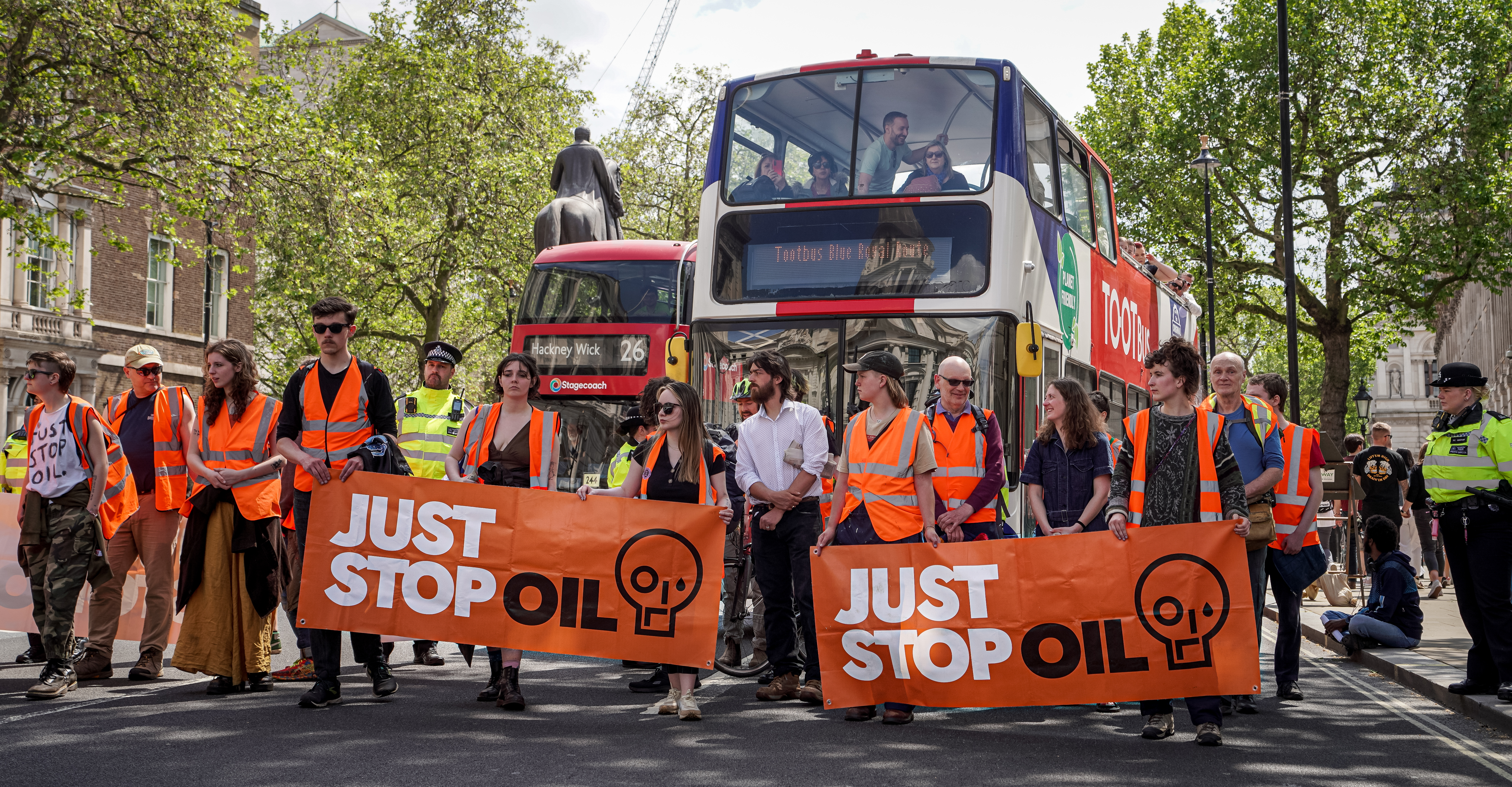
- Just Stop Oil slow walk up Whitehall, May 2023
- Formation: 14 February 2022; 4 years ago
- Location: United Kingdom
- Methods: Nonviolent resistance, civil resistance, direct action, publicity stunts, traffic obstruction
- Fields: Environmental movement Climate movement
- Affiliations: A22 Network; Youth Demand
- Website: juststopoil.org

Just Stop Oil (JSO) is a British environmental activist group primarily focused on the issue of human-caused climate change. The group aims to force the British government to commit to ending new fossil fuel licensing and production using civil resistance, nonviolent direct action, traffic obstruction, and publicity stunts.

The group was founded in February 2022 and began protesting at English oil terminals in April 2022. The group has received criticism for its disruptive and often illegal methods of activism. In response to tactics used by the group, successive British governments introduced or increased criminal penalties for non-violent direct action, which resulted in numerous members being given prison sentences.

On 27 March 2025, the group announced its intention to end active campaigning and focus on support for activists in prison and in court.

== Views and methods ==
Just Stop Oil opposes the United Kingdom government granting new fossil fuel licensing and production agreements; on its website, it calls for the government to stop all future consents and licensing agreements related to the development, exploration, and production of fossil fuels in the country. The group supports investment in renewable energy, and says that buildings need to have better thermal insulation to avoid wasting energy.

The group describes itself as decentralised and non-hierarchical, with activists in the group operating in autonomous blocs that share resources but have no formal leadership.

The group favours nonviolent direct action and civil resistance and follows an approach of general social disruption, similar to the methods of climate activist groups Extinction Rebellion and Insulate Britain, although favouring cultural institutions as protest targets.

In January 2024, at a meeting at the Old Print Works in Birmingham, Just Stop Oil was constituted as one of four groups under a central coordinating group called Umbrella. The other three groups under 'Umbrella' are: Assemble, Robin Hood, and Youth Demand.

=== Funding ===
Just Stop Oil reports that all their funding is through donations, with the group accepting both traditional currency and cryptocurrencies. In April 2022, it was reported that Just Stop Oil's primary source of funding was donations from the US-based Climate Emergency Fund. Through that fund, a notable donor to the group has been Aileen Getty, a descendant of the Getty family which founded the Getty Oil company. In response, the Climate Emergency Fund stated that Getty did not work in the fossil fuel industry herself.

In October 2023, green energy industrialist Dale Vince, who had donated over £340,000 to Just Stop Oil, announced he no longer planned to fund Just Stop Oil. He said: "under the current government, protest cannot work. I would go so far as to say that anything that could feed the Tories' culture-war narrative is counter-productive".

== Protests ==
=== 2022 ===
==== BAFTA Film Awards ====
On 13 March, four activists wearing 'Just Stop Oil' T-shirts disrupted the 75th British Academy Film Awards, at the Royal Albert Hall, in London..

==== Football matches ====
On 20 March, two supporters attempted to disrupt a football match at Arsenal's Emirates Stadium in London, but were intercepted. On 21 March, one supporter stopped play at a football match at Goodison Park in Liverpool when he ran onto the pitch and cable tied himself to a goalpost by his neck. The following day, one supporter briefly made it onto the pitch at Molineux Stadium in Wolverhampton. On 24 March, six supporters attempted to disrupt a match at the Tottenham Hotspur Stadium in north London. All were removed quickly, but the match was briefly stopped.

==== Oil Terminal Blockades ====
Beginning on 1 April, activists carried out England-wide blockades of ten critical oil facilities, intending to cut off the supply of petrol to South East England. They claimed they were inspired by the UK lorry drivers' protests in 2000 that paralysed petrol distribution. On 14 April, Just Stop Oil activists stopped and surrounded an oil tanker in London, causing congestion on the M4 motorway. On 15 April, supporters targeted Kingsbury, Navigator and Grays oil terminals, blockading roads and climbing onto oil tankers. The same day it was reported that Navigator Thames, ExxonMobil, and Valero had secured civil injunctions to prevent protest at their oil terminals. On 19 April, Just Stop Oil suspended its actions against fuel distribution for a week in the hope of action from the government. On 28 April, about 35 Just Stop Oil supporters sabotaged petrol pumps at two M25 motorway service stations (Cobham services in Surrey and Clacket Lane services in Kent).

==== British Grand Prix ====
On 3 July, a group of Just Stop Oil supporters walked onto the track at the 2022 British Grand Prix, at the Silverstone Circuit in Northamptonshire, England, after the race had been suspended due to a crash on the opening lap and sat down on the asphalt. They were arrested by police. Formula One drivers Sergio Pérez, Lewis Hamilton, and Carlos Sainz said they supported the protestors' cause but that they should not have put themselves at risk of physical harm. F1 president Stefano Domenicali criticised the protesting method and did not comment on the cause. Before the event, the Northamptonshire Police warned they had "creditable intelligence" that a group of protesters were planning to disrupt the race and potentially attempt a track invasion and that the protest would be related to environmental issues, but the warning did not mention Just Stop Oil by name.

==== Art galleries ====
Two supporters glued themselves to the frame of Vincent van Gogh's Peach Trees in Blossom at the Courthald Institute of Art on 30 June. Both were found guilty of causing criminal damage to the frame; one was imprisoned for three weeks and the other received a suspended sentence.

Two supporters glued themselves to the frame of John Constable's 1821 painting The Hay Wain at the National Gallery in London on 4 July. They covered the painting with a printed illustration that reimagined The Hay Wain as an "apocalyptic vision of the future" that depicted "the climate collapse and what it will do to this landscape". The two people were subsequently arrested by police and the painting was removed for examination by conservators.

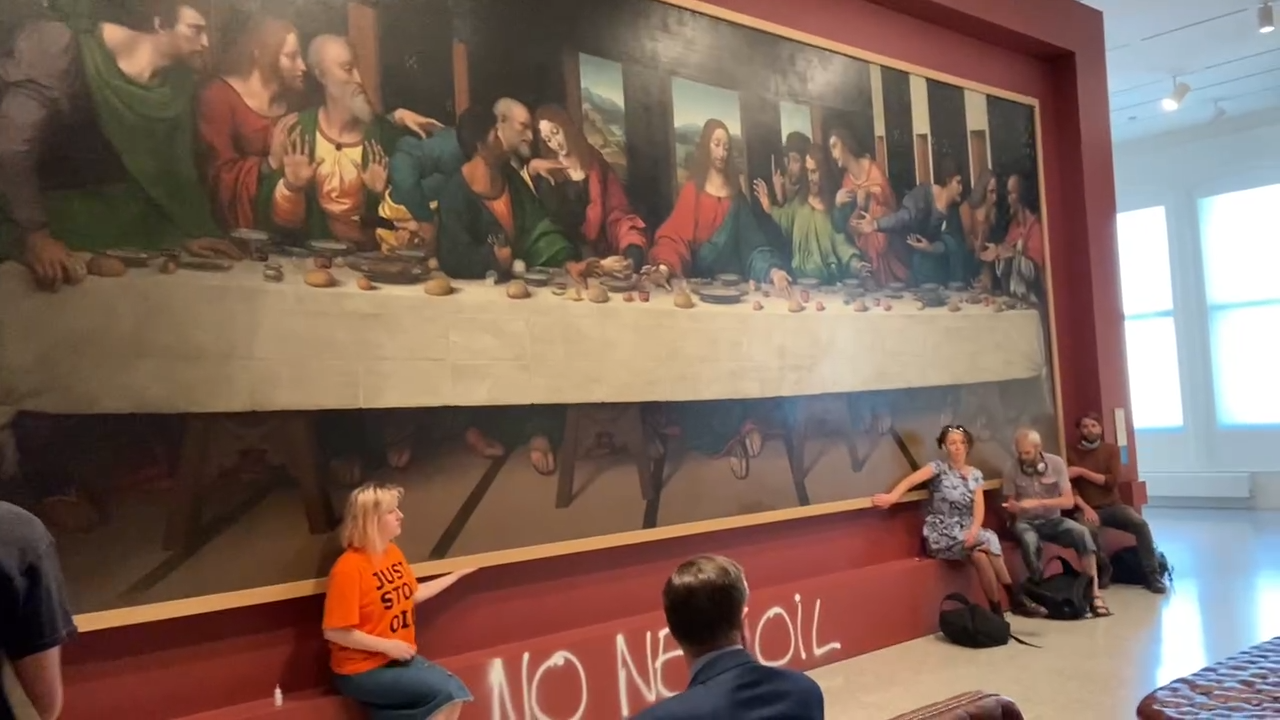
Protestors with hands glued to the frame of da Vinci's The Last Supper (July 2022)

A group of supporters glued themselves to the frame of a copy of Leonardo da Vinci's The Last Supper painting at the Royal Academy of Arts on 5 July. 'No New Oil' was spray painted on a wall underneath the painting. In February 2023, these activists were fined £486 each for causing unintended criminal damage but found not guilty to a further charge of causing damage to a piece of furniture that they had not been near.

On 14 October, two Just Stop Oil protesters, Phoebe Plummer and Anna Holland, threw tomato soup at the fourth version of Vincent van Gogh's 1888 work, The Arles Sunflowers, in the National Gallery, and then glued their hands to the wall below the painting before delivering a verbal statement. The painting was protected by glass, a factor Just Stop Oil said they had taken into account, and was not damaged; however, the frame, itself of significant value, suffered some slight damage. The rotating sign outside Scotland Yard was also spray-painted orange. More than 20 arrests were made. This act of vandalism garnered much less sympathy compared to Just Stop Oil's earlier protests. A witness said to The Guardian, "They may be trying to get people to think about the issues but all they end up doing is getting people really annoyed and angry." Emma Camp with Reason magazine reported that "The protest was probably ineffective on its own terms too. Throwing a can of tomato soup at a precious work of art has little to do with fighting fossil fuels." Vox noted that "...much of the media and public attention was negative, with many questioning the efficacy of the protest and criticising the protesters for hurting their own cause." Others defended the actions of the protesters.

Plummer and Holland were charged with criminal damage after causing £10,000 worth of damage to the gold-coloured frame of the glass-covered painting, and were jailed for 2 years and 20 months, respectively. The judge commented during sentencing that "You clearly think your beliefs give you the right to commit crimes when you feel like it. You do not."

==== London protests ====
On 26 August, the group blocked seven petrol stations in Central London and vandalised fuel pumps. Forty-three people around London were arrested on suspicion of criminal damage.

Around October, Just Stop Oil started a months-long protest in London. Throughout the period members blocked roads and bridges in London, including in Islington, Abbey Road, High Holborn/Kingsway, four bridges across the Thames, Westminster, as well as the M25 motorway. Just Stop Oil staged 32 days of disruption from the end of September and throughout October, which the Metropolitan Police said resulted in 677 arrests with 111 people charged.

On 17 October, two supporters scaled the London Queen Elizabeth II Bridge, which connects the M25 between Essex and Kent, causing its closure. One of the climbers, Morgan Trowland, was a bridge design engineer from London. The closure resulted in six miles (ten kilometres) of congestion on both directions of the bridge. After 36 hours, the protesters agreed with police to leave the bridge, and were arrested. The bridge remained closed for another 6 hours. The two were sentenced to a combined 5 years and seven months in jail. Also on 17 October, the group spray-painted the exterior of an Aston Martin car showroom on Park Lane, prompting criticism from Richard Hammond.

On 20 October, about 20 members spray-painted the exterior windows of Harrods in Knightsbridge, London. Two members of the group were arrested on suspicion of criminal damage.

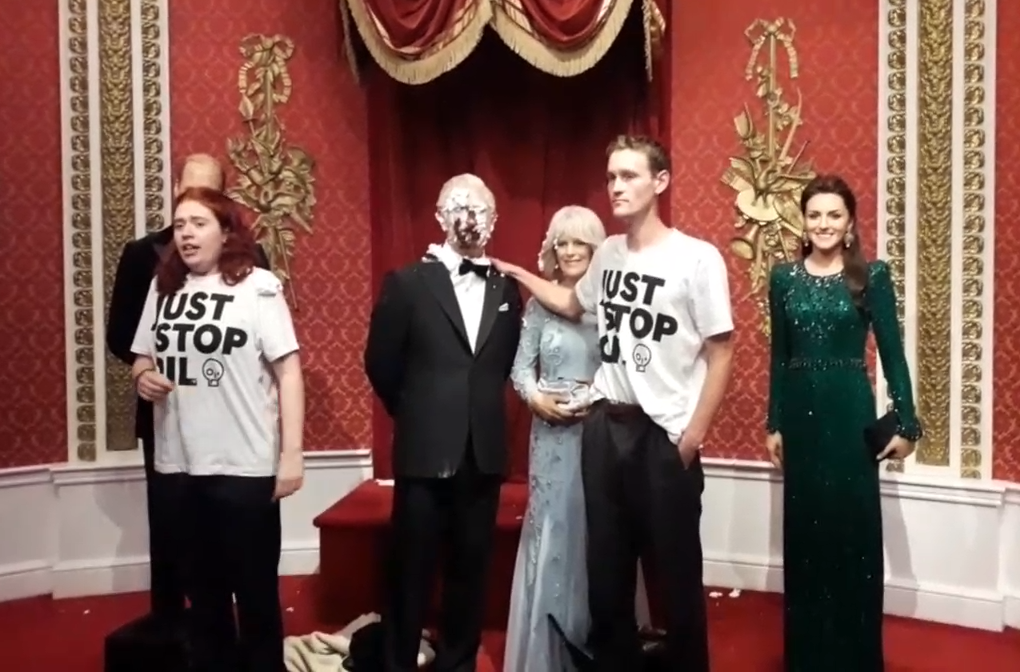
October 2022 protest at Madame Tussauds

On 24 October, two Just Stop Oil protesters smeared cake on a waxwork of King Charles III at Madame Tussauds.

On 25 October, protesters sprayed paint on 55 Tufton Street, London, a building housing climate change denial think tanks. On 26 October, police arrested more than a dozen activists who blocked Piccadilly and spray-painted luxury car showrooms in Mayfair.

On 31 October, activists targeted buildings in London used by the Home Office, MI5, the Bank of England and News Corp, spraying orange paint on each and demanding an end to new oil and gas licences. The targets were chosen because they represent "the four pillars that support and maintain the power of the fossil fuel economy", the group said. Six people were arrested by the Metropolitan Police.

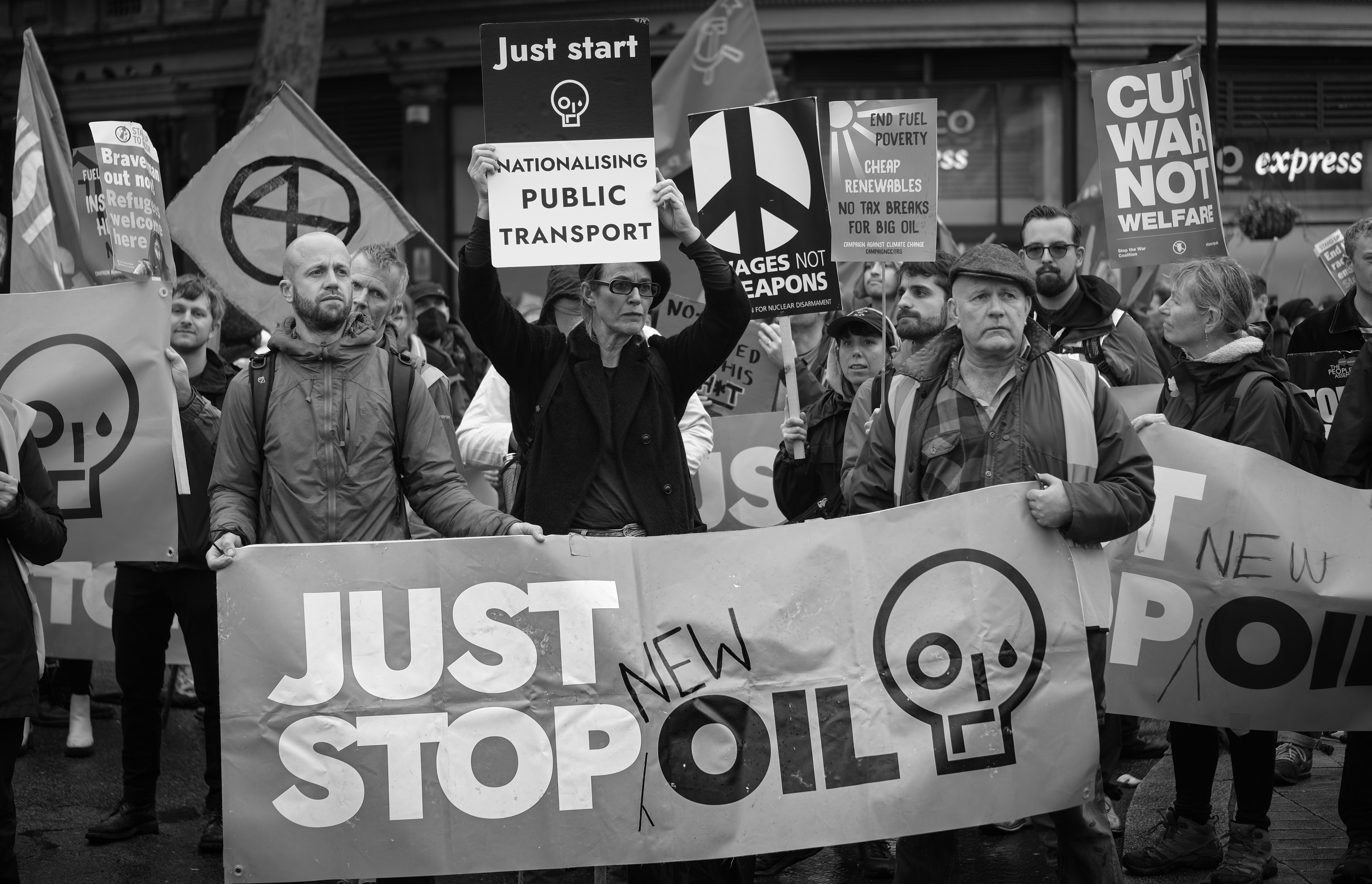
November 2022 protest near Trafalgar Square

==== M25 London orbital motorway ====
On 7 November, multiple junctions of the London orbital M25 motorway were closed. On 11 November, the group announced it would pause its protests on the M25. In November, 57-year-old Jan Goodey from Brighton was jailed for six months after pleading guilty to intentionally or recklessly causing a public nuisance after taking part in this protest.

On 9 November 2022, Gaie Delap was one of five activists who scaled an overhead gantry. Delap subsequently gained media attention after her home detention curfew was abandoned and reinstated.

In July 2024, five environmental protesters associated with the group were given multi-year prison sentences in the UK for their roles in planning the protest. Roger Hallam, a co-founder of the group, received a five-year sentence, while four other activists were sentenced to four years each. They were convicted of "conspiracy to cause a public nuisance". These sentences were among the harshest ever handed down for peaceful protest in the UK, sparking widespread criticism from various quarters, including Amnesty International and the UN special rapporteur on environmental defenders Michel Forst said that the outcome "should shock the conscience of any member of the public".

=== 2023 ===
==== Sporting events ====
On 17 April, during evening sessions at the 2023 World Snooker Championship, two protesters attempted to climb onto two tables at the Crucible Theatre in Sheffield, disrupting first-round matches between Robert Milkins and Joe Perry and between Mark Allen and Fan Zhengyi. One protester climbed onto the table where Milkins was playing Perry and spread an orange powder on it, halting play on that table for the night after efforts to remove the powder failed. Another protester failed to climb onto the table where Allen was playing Fan, after being restrained by referee Olivier Marteel. Both protesters were arrested. The match between Fan and Allen resumed after a 45-minute delay and the match between Milkins and Perry was rescheduled to begin again the following day.

Protesters forced a stoppage at the 27 May Rugby Premiership final between Saracens and Sale Sharks, in Twickenham, west London, by invading the pitch and throwing orange paint powder on the field. Two men were later charged by the Metropolitan Police with aggravated trespass.

On 1 June, prior to the eve of the one-off Test match between England and Ireland, the England cricket team bus was briefly halted by Just Stop Oil protestors during the team's way when they were set to reach the Lord's ground. England wicketkeeper Jonny Bairstow shared images on Instagram of Just Stop Oil activists who had disrupted England's team bus. On 28 June, the second Test of the 2023 Ashes series between England and Australia at Lord's was briefly interrupted by Just Stop Oil protestors who ran onto the outfield with bags of orange powder, but were stopped before reaching the wicket, one being carried off by Bairstow. Three protestors were arrested.

On 5 July, two protesters interrupted a tennis match at the 136th Wimbledon Championships by throwing orange confetti and jigsaw pieces onto the court.

On 17 July, one of the protesters who had disrupted play during the World Snooker Championship attempted to disrupt their own graduation ceremony at University of Exeter along with another individual.

On 21 July, during the 151st Open Championship at Hoylake, four protesters attempted to disrupt play, by running onto the 17th hole, setting off a flare, and throwing orange powder onto the green. They were later arrested by police.

==== Other protests ====
Three protesters were arrested on 25 May after throwing orange paint over a show garden at the Chelsea Flower Show.

Five protesters were charged by police after halting the annual London Pride march on 1 July. They sat in front of the Coca-Cola float to protest about the company's use of plastics.

On 8 July, a woman disrupted George Osborne's wedding by throwing orange confetti on Osborne and his wife as they left the ceremony. Just Stop Oil made statements calling the incident "Confettigate" and highlighting Osborne's environmental record during his stint as Chancellor. A spokesperson for the group later said the protestor did not represent Just Stop Oil.

On 14 July, two protesters interrupted the first night of the Proms at the Royal Albert Hall.

On 21 July, a traffic disruption organised by Just Stop Oil in Acton, London during rush hour went viral for preventing a mother with a newborn child from driving to the hospital.

On 4 October, five protesters stopped a performance of the West End production of Les Misérables.

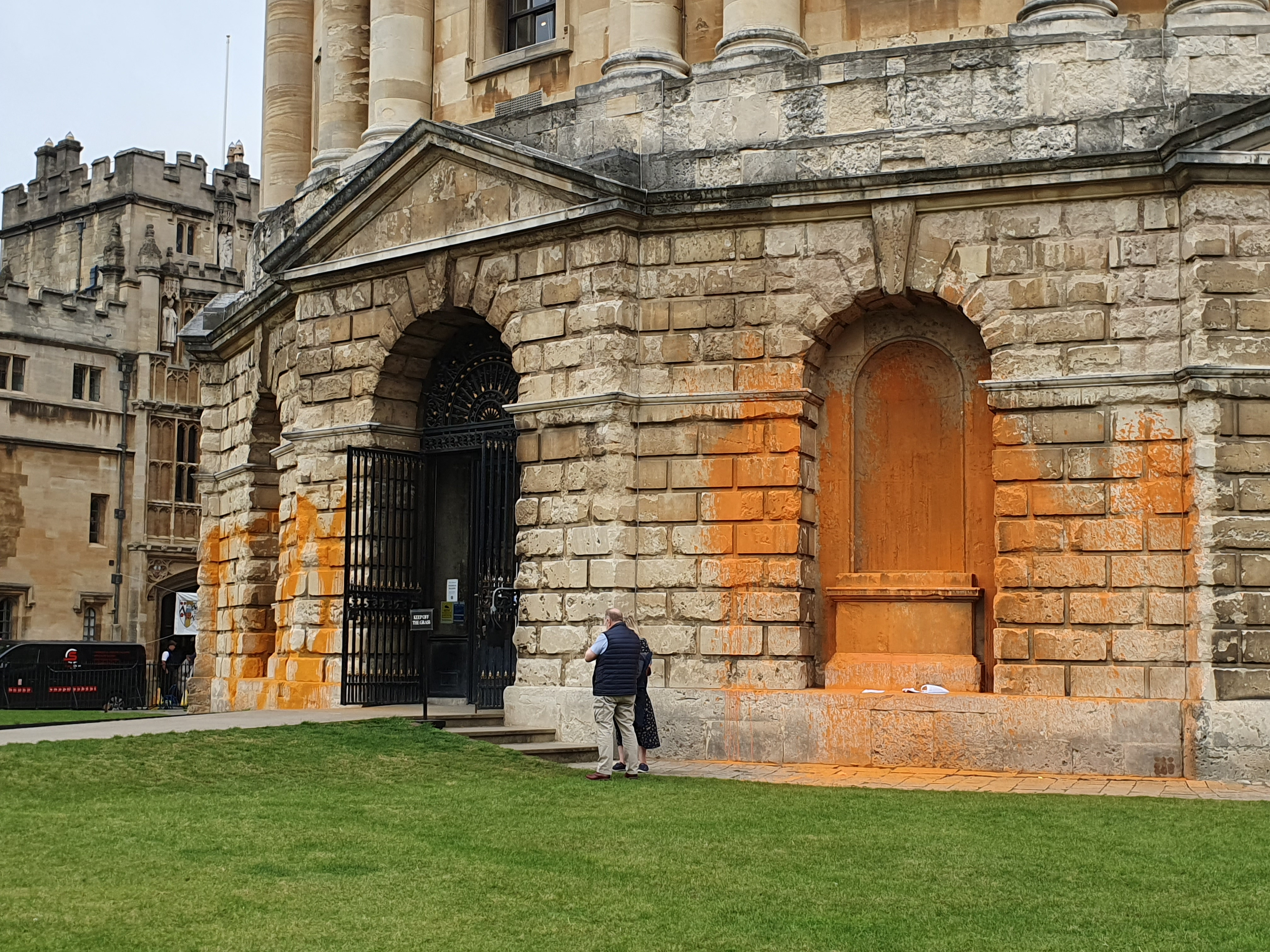
Orange paint on the entrance of the Radcliffe Camera after a Just Stop Oil protest in October 2023

On 9 and 10 October, protesters sprayed paint on the Queen's Building at Bristol University, The Forum at Exeter University and the Radcliffe Camera at the University of Oxford to highlight links between universities and fossil fuel groups.

On 15 October, three protesters disrupted a Tekken 7 tournament at EGX London by smearing and spraying orange paint on the competitors' computer monitors and the overhead display, demanding "that the UK government immediately cease all new licencing for coal, oil, and gas". The protesters were later removed by security and arrested by the police for criminal damage.

On 18 October, co-founders Roger Hallam and Indigo Rumbelow were arrested.

On 25 October, three protesters were arrested on suspicion of criminal damage after spraying the Wellington Arch with orange paint.

On 26 October, consultant gastroenterologist Will Stableforth and physiotherapist Steve Fay were arrested and taken into custody after spraying a reproduction Titanosaur skeleton orange at London's Natural History Museum.

On 30 October 62 protesters were arrested after holding a demonstration near Parliament Square in Westminster.

On 8 November, at least 40 protesters were arrested for disrupting traffic on Waterloo Bridge in Waterloo, London. The protest also garnered additional attention due to a claim from the Metropolitan Police that the protesters had blocked an ambulance flashing blue lights. Just Stop Oil accused the police of blaming the blockage on the organisation, claiming that the police officers were the ones blocking the ambulance. After the Waterloo Bridge demonstration was dispersed, five protesters from the group moved to The Strand and were arrested afterwards.

=== 2024 ===
In January 2024, the group announced the creation of a central coordinating group called Umbrella. The four groups under 'Umbrella' included Just Stop Oil, Assemble, Robin Hood, and Youth Demand. Many of the former members of the student wing of Just Stop Oil left to found Youth Demand.

On 22 February, Labour and Co-operative Party politician Stella Creasy wrote an opinion piece in The Guardian in response to Just Stop Oil co-founder Sarah Lunnon's opinion piece in The Guardian justifying picketing at the homes of Labour Party Members of Parliament (MPs) in an effort to convince Labour MPs to end Tory oil and gas policies. Creasy warned that Just Stop Oil's intimidation tactics will normalise violence and harassment towards politicians and undermine democracy.

On 27 March, Just Stop Oil posted a video on Twitter showing protester Phoebe Plummer breaking her bail by delivering a letter to what the organisation claimed was the house of Labour Party politician Wes Streeting. Streeting replied directly to the video stating that the home that Plummer visited and delivered the letter to was not his house.

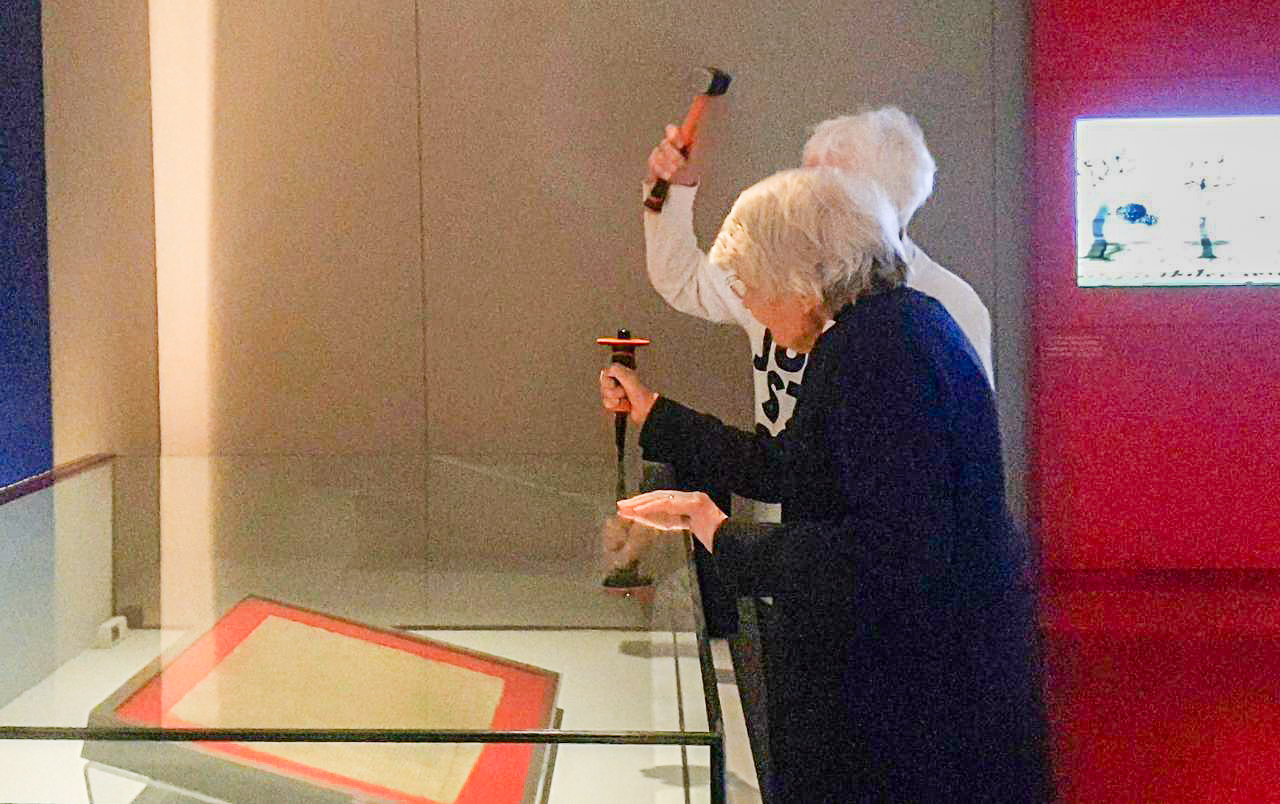
Protestors striking the glass container of the Magna Carta

On 10 May, two women targeted the Magna Carta in the British Library. Reverend Dr Sue Parfitt, 82, and Judy Bruce, an 85-year-old retired biology teacher, attempted to break the glass container around the document with a hammer and chisel. They then held up a sign stating, "The government is breaking the law". The documents themselves were undamaged.

On 7 June, two women protestors sprayed orange powder paint into the air from within the crowd gathered outside of Chester Cathedral for the wedding of Hugh Grosvenor, 7th Duke of Westminster and Olivia Henson. Cheshire Police arrested a 69-year-old woman from Manchester and a 73-year-old woman from Suffolk for using devices to project the powder paint near the entrance of the cathedral as the couple made their way to the car.

On 27 September, hours after the sentencing of Plummer and Holland for their actions in 2022, three more activists from the group again attempted to douse the Sunflowers collection of paintings in coloured liquid and were arrested for their actions.

==== Stonehenge ====
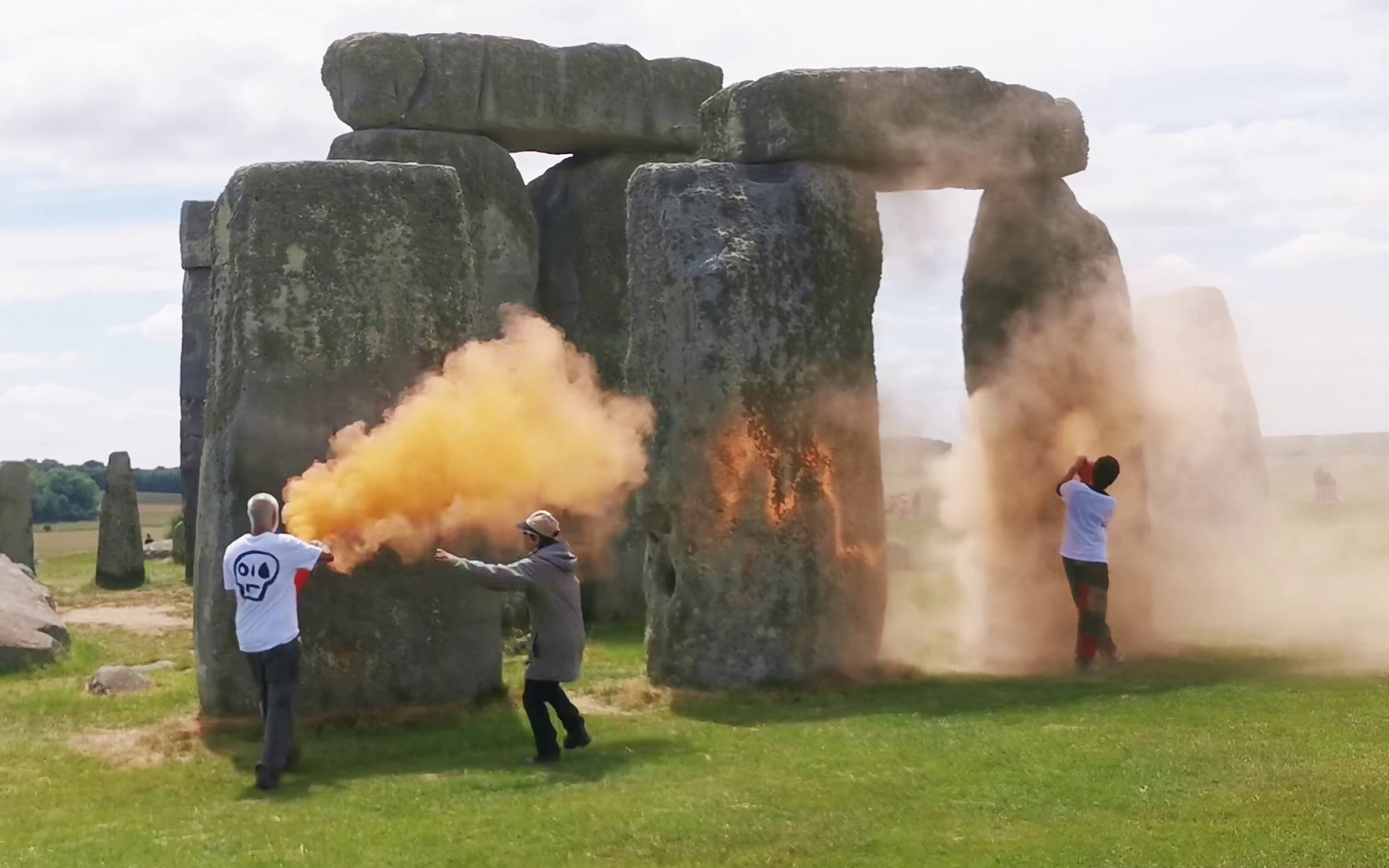
Protesters vandalising Stonehenge

In 2024, Just Stop Oil throwing orange paint onto three of Stonehenge's stones. According to Just Stop Oil's website, the paint was made of an "orange cornflour" that would wash away in the rain. Several bystanders shouted at and attempted to stop the activists. The two activists who defaced the structure were promptly arrested by Wiltshire Police. The paint was removed the following day with an air blower, and English Heritage reported that there was "no visible damage".

Just Stop Oil uploaded a video showing the defacement of the stones and the arrest of the activists involved and said that the activists "decorated" the stones to bring attention to the inability of the British government to "commit to defending our communities". The group also said that the date of the protest one day prior to the summer solstice intentionally coincided with the planned gathering on that day. English Heritage called the defacement "extremely upsetting" and began an investigation to assess the damage caused by the paint. The English Heritage webpage for Stonehenge calls for visitors to respect the stones since they form a World Heritage Site, a scheduled monument, and a place sacred to many. Just Stop Oil named the arrested protesters as 21-year-old student Niamh Lynch and 73-year-old Rajan Naidu.

Prime Minister Rishi Sunak called it a "disgraceful act of vandalism" to one of the UK's and the world's oldest and most significant monuments, and called on anyone associated with Just Stop Oil or who donated to them to condemn the act. Leader of the Labour Party Sir Keir Starmer called the defacement "outrageous" while deeming Just Stop Oil as "pathetic", demanding that the activists and anyone else involved with the act "face the full force of the law".

Archaeologist Mike Pitts expressed his strong concern over the potential damage, and said that the megaliths were fenced off and guarded to protect their surfaces, which were entirely covered in prehistoric markings that have not been fully analyzed. He also expressed concern about possible damage to the diverse lichen community growing on the megalith surfaces. Conversely, Sarah Kerr, a lecturer in archaeology at University College Cork, said that the effects of climate change pose a much greater threat to Stonehenge than cornflour, writing, "if you worry about damage to British heritage you should listen to Just Stop Oil".

A Just Stop Oil spokesperson responded to the outrage by stating that continued government inaction would entitle Just Stop Oil activists to recruit other European activists to acts of resistance, vaguely specifying that "Stone circles can be found in every part of Europe, showing how we've always cooperated across vast distances – we're building on that legacy."

On 31 October 2025, the three Just Stop Oil protesters were cleared at Salisbury crown court. The jury heard that there had been no lasting damage to the stones, and that the removal costs had been £620.

==== Disruption to airports ====
On 20 June, JSO protestors spray painted private jets at a private airfield at Stansted Airport. The group had been targeting a jet belonging to singer Taylor Swift, but could not locate it.

During the week of 27 June 27 people were arrested across the UK regarding alleged plans to conspire to disrupt national infrastructure including airports. In a statement, Metropolitan Police, who arrested six people on 27 June, said "We know Just Stop Oil plan to disrupt airports and thousands of holidaymakers this summer", adding "Anyone who disrupts the safety and security of an airport can expect to be dealt with swiftly and robustly." Four of the arrests were made on 25 June after they had been identified at Gatwick Airport. Bail conditions included "not travelling within one kilometre of any UK airport unless passing by while on a mode of transport."

On 29 July, the group blocked departure gates at Gatwick Airport and seven people were arrested.

=== 2025 ===
On 13 January two activists used chalk paint to mark the tombstone of Charles Darwin in Westminster Abbey with "1.5 is dead". They were subsequently arrested by the Metropolitan Police. The message refers to the news in December 2024 that the Copernicus Climate Change Service confirmed that 2024 was the first year that the average temperature exceeded 1.5 °C above pre-industrial levels.

One of the activists said that "We've done it on Darwin's grave specifically because he would be turning in that grave because of the sixth mass extinction taking place now. I believe he would approve because he was a good scientist and he would be following the science, and he would be as upset as us with the government for ignoring the science."

A further two activists were charged with aggravated trespass on 29 January after taking to the stage and disrupting a performance of The Tempest at the Theatre Royal, Drury Lane on 27 January; the pair had held up a banner reading "over 1.5 degrees is a global shipwreck" whilst the actors were escorted from the stage by theatre staff.

=== End of active campaigning ===
On 27 March 2025, the group announced that it was "hanging up the hi-vis" to end active campaigning, with future actions by supporters likely to take place under a new banner. While it no longer actively campaigns, it continues to exist to support activists on trial or in prison as a result of its actions despite its disbandment.

The group sought to claim victory for its campaign, stating that it had achieved its aim to end new licences for fossil fuel extraction within the United Kingdom, while denying that the dissolution was due to increased incarceration of the group's supporters. The group's claims of a victory were scrutinised by others however, with co-founder Roger Hallam having previously acknowledged the group only made a "marginal" impact and other members acknowledging that the climate crisis had gotten worse, leading to BBC News' climate editor Justin Rowlatt to conclude the group's wider aim of ending fossil fuel production had "manifestly not been achieved". An examination of the group by Novara Media stated meanwhile that despite the claims otherwise the group had struggled to recruit activists once the prospect of imprisonment became increasingly likely, and that views from other environmental groups was more mixed with some taking the view that JSO's actions had instead impeded efforts by the recently elected Labour government to block new licences.

In October 2025, The i Paper published accusations of a "toxic culture" regarding sexual assault within JSO, detailing that at least five male members of the group "have been accused of targeting and abusing young female staff and volunteers”.

In late 2025, a group named Take Back Power was established by people previously linked to JSO. The group's aim was reported to be on "combating inequality, protecting democracy and stemming the rise of fascism in the UK".

=== 2026 ===
Protesters blocking the road outside parliament

After over a year of inactivity, the group re-established itself with a protest blocking the road outside parliament during Andy Burnham’s first Prime Minister's Questions. A spokesperson for Just Stop Oil stated that the protest was timed to coincide with the Prime Minister’s Questions as Burnham was “deciding whether to have more oil and gas projects”.

== See also ==
- Climate crisis
- Environmental direct action in the United Kingdom
- Similar groups
  - Dernière Rénovation (France)
  - Renovate Switzerland (Switzerland)
  - Last Generation (Germany)
